

505001–505100 

|-bgcolor=#FA8072
| 505001 ||  || — || May 26, 2011 || Siding Spring || SSS || unusual || align=right | 2.5 km || 
|-id=002 bgcolor=#E9E9E9
| 505002 ||  || — || May 22, 2011 || Kitt Peak || Spacewatch ||  || align=right | 1.9 km || 
|-id=003 bgcolor=#E9E9E9
| 505003 ||  || — || January 30, 2011 || Haleakala || Pan-STARRS ||  || align=right | 2.3 km || 
|-id=004 bgcolor=#d6d6d6
| 505004 ||  || — || May 23, 2011 || Mount Lemmon || Mount Lemmon Survey ||  || align=right | 2.3 km || 
|-id=005 bgcolor=#d6d6d6
| 505005 ||  || — || June 3, 2011 || Mount Lemmon || Mount Lemmon Survey ||  || align=right | 3.0 km || 
|-id=006 bgcolor=#d6d6d6
| 505006 ||  || — || June 3, 2011 || Mount Lemmon || Mount Lemmon Survey ||  || align=right | 2.7 km || 
|-id=007 bgcolor=#d6d6d6
| 505007 ||  || — || July 5, 2011 || Haleakala || Pan-STARRS ||  || align=right | 3.4 km || 
|-id=008 bgcolor=#d6d6d6
| 505008 ||  || — || June 24, 2011 || Kitt Peak || Spacewatch ||  || align=right | 2.5 km || 
|-id=009 bgcolor=#d6d6d6
| 505009 ||  || — || September 17, 2006 || Catalina || CSS ||  || align=right | 3.1 km || 
|-id=010 bgcolor=#fefefe
| 505010 ||  || — || July 26, 2011 || Haleakala || Pan-STARRS || H || align=right data-sort-value="0.62" | 620 m || 
|-id=011 bgcolor=#d6d6d6
| 505011 ||  || — || February 11, 2010 || WISE || WISE || Tj (2.97) || align=right | 3.1 km || 
|-id=012 bgcolor=#d6d6d6
| 505012 ||  || — || August 1, 2011 || Haleakala || Pan-STARRS ||  || align=right | 2.1 km || 
|-id=013 bgcolor=#d6d6d6
| 505013 ||  || — || July 11, 2010 || WISE || WISE || EMA || align=right | 2.9 km || 
|-id=014 bgcolor=#d6d6d6
| 505014 ||  || — || July 28, 2011 || Siding Spring || SSS ||  || align=right | 2.9 km || 
|-id=015 bgcolor=#d6d6d6
| 505015 ||  || — || June 11, 2010 || WISE || WISE || Tj (2.94) || align=right | 2.5 km || 
|-id=016 bgcolor=#d6d6d6
| 505016 ||  || — || August 10, 2011 || Haleakala || Pan-STARRS || ARM || align=right | 3.0 km || 
|-id=017 bgcolor=#d6d6d6
| 505017 ||  || — || May 16, 2010 || WISE || WISE ||  || align=right | 3.6 km || 
|-id=018 bgcolor=#d6d6d6
| 505018 ||  || — || July 7, 2010 || WISE || WISE ||  || align=right | 3.2 km || 
|-id=019 bgcolor=#FFC2E0
| 505019 ||  || — || August 23, 2011 || Haleakala || Pan-STARRS || APO || align=right data-sort-value="0.59" | 590 m || 
|-id=020 bgcolor=#d6d6d6
| 505020 ||  || — || August 24, 2011 || Haleakala || Pan-STARRS || EOS || align=right | 2.3 km || 
|-id=021 bgcolor=#d6d6d6
| 505021 ||  || — || February 14, 2010 || WISE || WISE ||  || align=right | 4.0 km || 
|-id=022 bgcolor=#d6d6d6
| 505022 ||  || — || June 8, 2011 || Haleakala || Pan-STARRS ||  || align=right | 2.8 km || 
|-id=023 bgcolor=#d6d6d6
| 505023 ||  || — || August 24, 2011 || La Sagra || OAM Obs. ||  || align=right | 3.2 km || 
|-id=024 bgcolor=#d6d6d6
| 505024 ||  || — || September 27, 2000 || Socorro || LINEAR ||  || align=right | 3.2 km || 
|-id=025 bgcolor=#d6d6d6
| 505025 ||  || — || August 30, 2011 || Haleakala || Pan-STARRS || EOS || align=right | 2.4 km || 
|-id=026 bgcolor=#d6d6d6
| 505026 ||  || — || August 31, 2011 || Haleakala || Pan-STARRS || EOS || align=right | 1.8 km || 
|-id=027 bgcolor=#d6d6d6
| 505027 ||  || — || August 31, 2011 || Haleakala || Pan-STARRS || EOS || align=right | 2.0 km || 
|-id=028 bgcolor=#d6d6d6
| 505028 ||  || — || August 30, 2011 || Haleakala || Pan-STARRS || EOS || align=right | 2.0 km || 
|-id=029 bgcolor=#d6d6d6
| 505029 ||  || — || August 23, 2011 || Haleakala || Pan-STARRS ||  || align=right | 3.2 km || 
|-id=030 bgcolor=#d6d6d6
| 505030 ||  || — || February 9, 2008 || Kitt Peak || Spacewatch ||  || align=right | 2.7 km || 
|-id=031 bgcolor=#d6d6d6
| 505031 ||  || — || September 30, 2006 || Mount Lemmon || Mount Lemmon Survey || THM || align=right | 2.1 km || 
|-id=032 bgcolor=#d6d6d6
| 505032 ||  || — || July 5, 2005 || Mount Lemmon || Mount Lemmon Survey ||  || align=right | 2.5 km || 
|-id=033 bgcolor=#d6d6d6
| 505033 ||  || — || November 14, 2006 || Kitt Peak || Spacewatch ||  || align=right | 2.2 km || 
|-id=034 bgcolor=#d6d6d6
| 505034 ||  || — || November 12, 2006 || Mount Lemmon || Mount Lemmon Survey ||  || align=right | 2.1 km || 
|-id=035 bgcolor=#d6d6d6
| 505035 ||  || — || February 6, 2008 || Kitt Peak || Spacewatch || HYG || align=right | 2.9 km || 
|-id=036 bgcolor=#d6d6d6
| 505036 ||  || — || February 13, 2010 || WISE || WISE ||  || align=right | 3.4 km || 
|-id=037 bgcolor=#d6d6d6
| 505037 ||  || — || August 24, 2011 || Haleakala || Pan-STARRS ||  || align=right | 3.0 km || 
|-id=038 bgcolor=#d6d6d6
| 505038 ||  || — || June 9, 2011 || Haleakala || Pan-STARRS ||  || align=right | 3.1 km || 
|-id=039 bgcolor=#d6d6d6
| 505039 ||  || — || September 5, 2011 || Haleakala || Pan-STARRS ||  || align=right | 2.4 km || 
|-id=040 bgcolor=#d6d6d6
| 505040 ||  || — || December 31, 2007 || Catalina || CSS ||  || align=right | 3.0 km || 
|-id=041 bgcolor=#d6d6d6
| 505041 ||  || — || September 26, 2006 || Mount Lemmon || Mount Lemmon Survey || VER || align=right | 2.0 km || 
|-id=042 bgcolor=#d6d6d6
| 505042 ||  || — || September 5, 2011 || Haleakala || Pan-STARRS ||  || align=right | 2.5 km || 
|-id=043 bgcolor=#d6d6d6
| 505043 ||  || — || September 4, 2011 || Haleakala || Pan-STARRS ||  || align=right | 2.5 km || 
|-id=044 bgcolor=#d6d6d6
| 505044 ||  || — || July 31, 2010 || WISE || WISE || Tj (2.98) || align=right | 2.2 km || 
|-id=045 bgcolor=#d6d6d6
| 505045 ||  || — || August 24, 2011 || Haleakala || Pan-STARRS ||  || align=right | 2.5 km || 
|-id=046 bgcolor=#d6d6d6
| 505046 ||  || — || August 30, 2011 || Haleakala || Pan-STARRS ||  || align=right | 2.2 km || 
|-id=047 bgcolor=#d6d6d6
| 505047 ||  || — || September 17, 2011 || Haleakala || Pan-STARRS ||  || align=right | 2.4 km || 
|-id=048 bgcolor=#d6d6d6
| 505048 ||  || — || February 2, 2008 || Kitt Peak || Spacewatch || VER || align=right | 2.2 km || 
|-id=049 bgcolor=#d6d6d6
| 505049 ||  || — || September 2, 2011 || Haleakala || Pan-STARRS ||  || align=right | 2.7 km || 
|-id=050 bgcolor=#d6d6d6
| 505050 ||  || — || September 23, 2005 || Kitt Peak || Spacewatch || HYG || align=right | 2.4 km || 
|-id=051 bgcolor=#d6d6d6
| 505051 ||  || — || April 15, 2010 || WISE || WISE ||  || align=right | 4.1 km || 
|-id=052 bgcolor=#d6d6d6
| 505052 ||  || — || November 23, 2006 || Mount Lemmon || Mount Lemmon Survey ||  || align=right | 3.5 km || 
|-id=053 bgcolor=#d6d6d6
| 505053 ||  || — || January 11, 2008 || Kitt Peak || Spacewatch ||  || align=right | 2.5 km || 
|-id=054 bgcolor=#d6d6d6
| 505054 ||  || — || August 31, 2011 || Haleakala || Pan-STARRS || TEL || align=right | 1.7 km || 
|-id=055 bgcolor=#fefefe
| 505055 ||  || — || August 30, 2011 || Haleakala || Pan-STARRS ||  || align=right data-sort-value="0.60" | 600 m || 
|-id=056 bgcolor=#d6d6d6
| 505056 ||  || — || May 19, 2010 || Mount Lemmon || Mount Lemmon Survey ||  || align=right | 2.3 km || 
|-id=057 bgcolor=#d6d6d6
| 505057 ||  || — || September 26, 2006 || Kitt Peak || Spacewatch ||  || align=right | 2.4 km || 
|-id=058 bgcolor=#d6d6d6
| 505058 ||  || — || September 24, 2011 || Mount Lemmon || Mount Lemmon Survey ||  || align=right | 2.5 km || 
|-id=059 bgcolor=#d6d6d6
| 505059 ||  || — || February 10, 2008 || Kitt Peak || Spacewatch ||  || align=right | 2.6 km || 
|-id=060 bgcolor=#d6d6d6
| 505060 ||  || — || September 2, 2011 || Haleakala || Pan-STARRS ||  || align=right | 2.7 km || 
|-id=061 bgcolor=#d6d6d6
| 505061 ||  || — || September 18, 2011 || Mount Lemmon || Mount Lemmon Survey ||  || align=right | 3.1 km || 
|-id=062 bgcolor=#d6d6d6
| 505062 ||  || — || October 7, 2005 || Kitt Peak || Spacewatch ||  || align=right | 2.7 km || 
|-id=063 bgcolor=#d6d6d6
| 505063 ||  || — || September 26, 2011 || Haleakala || Pan-STARRS ||  || align=right | 2.5 km || 
|-id=064 bgcolor=#d6d6d6
| 505064 ||  || — || September 23, 2011 || Kitt Peak || Spacewatch ||  || align=right | 2.9 km || 
|-id=065 bgcolor=#d6d6d6
| 505065 ||  || — || September 23, 2011 || Kitt Peak || Spacewatch ||  || align=right | 2.5 km || 
|-id=066 bgcolor=#d6d6d6
| 505066 ||  || — || March 26, 2010 || WISE || WISE || EUP || align=right | 6.2 km || 
|-id=067 bgcolor=#d6d6d6
| 505067 ||  || — || April 18, 2009 || Kitt Peak || Spacewatch ||  || align=right | 2.5 km || 
|-id=068 bgcolor=#d6d6d6
| 505068 ||  || — || June 11, 2011 || Haleakala || Pan-STARRS ||  || align=right | 3.9 km || 
|-id=069 bgcolor=#d6d6d6
| 505069 ||  || — || April 7, 2008 || Mount Lemmon || Mount Lemmon Survey ||  || align=right | 2.7 km || 
|-id=070 bgcolor=#d6d6d6
| 505070 ||  || — || August 23, 2011 || Haleakala || Pan-STARRS || EOS || align=right | 1.8 km || 
|-id=071 bgcolor=#d6d6d6
| 505071 ||  || — || August 24, 2011 || Haleakala || Pan-STARRS ||  || align=right | 3.4 km || 
|-id=072 bgcolor=#d6d6d6
| 505072 ||  || — || September 29, 2011 || Mount Lemmon || Mount Lemmon Survey ||  || align=right | 2.7 km || 
|-id=073 bgcolor=#d6d6d6
| 505073 ||  || — || September 26, 2011 || Haleakala || Pan-STARRS ||  || align=right | 3.0 km || 
|-id=074 bgcolor=#d6d6d6
| 505074 ||  || — || February 4, 2009 || Kitt Peak || Spacewatch ||  || align=right | 2.9 km || 
|-id=075 bgcolor=#d6d6d6
| 505075 ||  || — || October 16, 2006 || Kitt Peak || Spacewatch ||  || align=right | 2.8 km || 
|-id=076 bgcolor=#d6d6d6
| 505076 ||  || — || August 28, 2005 || Siding Spring || SSS ||  || align=right | 3.4 km || 
|-id=077 bgcolor=#d6d6d6
| 505077 ||  || — || April 5, 2003 || Kitt Peak || Spacewatch ||  || align=right | 2.8 km || 
|-id=078 bgcolor=#d6d6d6
| 505078 ||  || — || September 24, 2011 || Haleakala || Pan-STARRS ||  || align=right | 3.2 km || 
|-id=079 bgcolor=#d6d6d6
| 505079 ||  || — || September 24, 2011 || Haleakala || Pan-STARRS ||  || align=right | 3.4 km || 
|-id=080 bgcolor=#d6d6d6
| 505080 ||  || — || September 2, 2011 || Haleakala || Pan-STARRS ||  || align=right | 2.4 km || 
|-id=081 bgcolor=#fefefe
| 505081 ||  || — || October 2, 2011 || La Sagra || OAM Obs. || H || align=right data-sort-value="0.89" | 890 m || 
|-id=082 bgcolor=#d6d6d6
| 505082 ||  || — || September 25, 2005 || Catalina || CSS ||  || align=right | 2.4 km || 
|-id=083 bgcolor=#d6d6d6
| 505083 ||  || — || September 19, 2011 || Haleakala || Pan-STARRS ||  || align=right | 2.9 km || 
|-id=084 bgcolor=#d6d6d6
| 505084 ||  || — || September 19, 2011 || Mount Lemmon || Mount Lemmon Survey ||  || align=right | 2.0 km || 
|-id=085 bgcolor=#fefefe
| 505085 ||  || — || March 21, 2010 || Mount Lemmon || Mount Lemmon Survey || H || align=right data-sort-value="0.92" | 920 m || 
|-id=086 bgcolor=#fefefe
| 505086 ||  || — || December 27, 2005 || Kitt Peak || Spacewatch ||  || align=right data-sort-value="0.53" | 530 m || 
|-id=087 bgcolor=#d6d6d6
| 505087 ||  || — || September 24, 2011 || Catalina || CSS ||  || align=right | 3.1 km || 
|-id=088 bgcolor=#d6d6d6
| 505088 ||  || — || April 16, 2010 || WISE || WISE ||  || align=right | 4.6 km || 
|-id=089 bgcolor=#d6d6d6
| 505089 ||  || — || December 2, 2005 || Kitt Peak || Spacewatch || 7:4 || align=right | 2.8 km || 
|-id=090 bgcolor=#d6d6d6
| 505090 ||  || — || September 25, 2011 || Haleakala || Pan-STARRS ||  || align=right | 3.6 km || 
|-id=091 bgcolor=#d6d6d6
| 505091 ||  || — || September 25, 2011 || Haleakala || Pan-STARRS ||  || align=right | 2.9 km || 
|-id=092 bgcolor=#d6d6d6
| 505092 ||  || — || February 24, 2010 || WISE || WISE ||  || align=right | 4.6 km || 
|-id=093 bgcolor=#FFC2E0
| 505093 ||  || — || November 3, 2011 || Mount Lemmon || Mount Lemmon Survey || AMO || align=right data-sort-value="0.56" | 560 m || 
|-id=094 bgcolor=#d6d6d6
| 505094 ||  || — || April 4, 2008 || Mount Lemmon || Mount Lemmon Survey || TIR || align=right | 2.8 km || 
|-id=095 bgcolor=#d6d6d6
| 505095 ||  || — || December 9, 2006 || Kitt Peak || Spacewatch ||  || align=right | 3.6 km || 
|-id=096 bgcolor=#d6d6d6
| 505096 ||  || — || April 8, 2010 || WISE || WISE || Tj (2.99) || align=right | 4.1 km || 
|-id=097 bgcolor=#d6d6d6
| 505097 ||  || — || April 27, 2008 || Kitt Peak || Spacewatch || TIR || align=right | 2.9 km || 
|-id=098 bgcolor=#fefefe
| 505098 ||  || — || October 9, 2004 || Kitt Peak || Spacewatch ||  || align=right data-sort-value="0.68" | 680 m || 
|-id=099 bgcolor=#d6d6d6
| 505099 ||  || — || February 12, 2004 || Kitt Peak || Spacewatch || 3:2 || align=right | 3.5 km || 
|-id=100 bgcolor=#d6d6d6
| 505100 ||  || — || December 27, 2011 || Mount Lemmon || Mount Lemmon Survey || 3:2 || align=right | 3.5 km || 
|}

505101–505200 

|-bgcolor=#d6d6d6
| 505101 ||  || — || January 26, 2012 || Haleakala || Pan-STARRS ||  || align=right | 4.3 km || 
|-id=102 bgcolor=#fefefe
| 505102 ||  || — || January 13, 2002 || Socorro || LINEAR ||  || align=right data-sort-value="0.68" | 680 m || 
|-id=103 bgcolor=#fefefe
| 505103 ||  || — || September 9, 2007 || Kitt Peak || Spacewatch ||  || align=right data-sort-value="0.62" | 620 m || 
|-id=104 bgcolor=#fefefe
| 505104 ||  || — || January 29, 2012 || Kitt Peak || Spacewatch ||  || align=right data-sort-value="0.54" | 540 m || 
|-id=105 bgcolor=#fefefe
| 505105 ||  || — || January 26, 2012 || Mount Lemmon || Mount Lemmon Survey ||  || align=right data-sort-value="0.57" | 570 m || 
|-id=106 bgcolor=#fefefe
| 505106 ||  || — || January 13, 2005 || Kitt Peak || Spacewatch ||  || align=right data-sort-value="0.63" | 630 m || 
|-id=107 bgcolor=#fefefe
| 505107 ||  || — || January 19, 2012 || Haleakala || Pan-STARRS ||  || align=right data-sort-value="0.75" | 750 m || 
|-id=108 bgcolor=#fefefe
| 505108 ||  || — || February 16, 2012 || Haleakala || Pan-STARRS ||  || align=right data-sort-value="0.70" | 700 m || 
|-id=109 bgcolor=#fefefe
| 505109 ||  || — || March 13, 2005 || Kitt Peak || Spacewatch ||  || align=right data-sort-value="0.75" | 750 m || 
|-id=110 bgcolor=#fefefe
| 505110 ||  || — || April 4, 2005 || Catalina || CSS ||  || align=right data-sort-value="0.68" | 680 m || 
|-id=111 bgcolor=#fefefe
| 505111 ||  || — || January 18, 2012 || Mount Lemmon || Mount Lemmon Survey ||  || align=right data-sort-value="0.69" | 690 m || 
|-id=112 bgcolor=#fefefe
| 505112 ||  || — || October 21, 2007 || Kitt Peak || Spacewatch ||  || align=right data-sort-value="0.59" | 590 m || 
|-id=113 bgcolor=#fefefe
| 505113 ||  || — || February 26, 2012 || Socorro || LINEAR || PHO || align=right | 1.3 km || 
|-id=114 bgcolor=#fefefe
| 505114 ||  || — || October 9, 2010 || Mount Lemmon || Mount Lemmon Survey ||  || align=right data-sort-value="0.58" | 580 m || 
|-id=115 bgcolor=#fefefe
| 505115 ||  || — || March 3, 2005 || Kitt Peak || Spacewatch ||  || align=right data-sort-value="0.77" | 770 m || 
|-id=116 bgcolor=#fefefe
| 505116 ||  || — || January 30, 2012 || Kitt Peak || Spacewatch ||  || align=right data-sort-value="0.64" | 640 m || 
|-id=117 bgcolor=#fefefe
| 505117 ||  || — || January 19, 2012 || Haleakala || Pan-STARRS ||  || align=right data-sort-value="0.78" | 780 m || 
|-id=118 bgcolor=#fefefe
| 505118 ||  || — || May 16, 2009 || Mount Lemmon || Mount Lemmon Survey ||  || align=right data-sort-value="0.57" | 570 m || 
|-id=119 bgcolor=#E9E9E9
| 505119 ||  || — || February 21, 2012 || Kitt Peak || Spacewatch ||  || align=right | 1.4 km || 
|-id=120 bgcolor=#fefefe
| 505120 ||  || — || September 29, 2010 || Mount Lemmon || Mount Lemmon Survey ||  || align=right data-sort-value="0.59" | 590 m || 
|-id=121 bgcolor=#fefefe
| 505121 ||  || — || March 1, 2012 || Mount Lemmon || Mount Lemmon Survey || NYS || align=right data-sort-value="0.69" | 690 m || 
|-id=122 bgcolor=#fefefe
| 505122 ||  || — || November 4, 2007 || Kitt Peak || Spacewatch ||  || align=right data-sort-value="0.64" | 640 m || 
|-id=123 bgcolor=#fefefe
| 505123 ||  || — || October 1, 2010 || Kitt Peak || Spacewatch ||  || align=right data-sort-value="0.64" | 640 m || 
|-id=124 bgcolor=#fefefe
| 505124 ||  || — || February 25, 2012 || Kitt Peak || Spacewatch ||  || align=right data-sort-value="0.77" | 770 m || 
|-id=125 bgcolor=#fefefe
| 505125 ||  || — || September 12, 2007 || Mount Lemmon || Mount Lemmon Survey ||  || align=right data-sort-value="0.68" | 680 m || 
|-id=126 bgcolor=#fefefe
| 505126 ||  || — || September 30, 2006 || Kitt Peak || Spacewatch || PHO || align=right data-sort-value="0.89" | 890 m || 
|-id=127 bgcolor=#fefefe
| 505127 ||  || — || March 27, 2012 || Kitt Peak || Spacewatch ||  || align=right data-sort-value="0.82" | 820 m || 
|-id=128 bgcolor=#fefefe
| 505128 ||  || — || March 13, 2005 || Kitt Peak || Spacewatch ||  || align=right data-sort-value="0.62" | 620 m || 
|-id=129 bgcolor=#fefefe
| 505129 ||  || — || December 19, 2007 || Mount Lemmon || Mount Lemmon Survey ||  || align=right data-sort-value="0.71" | 710 m || 
|-id=130 bgcolor=#fefefe
| 505130 ||  || — || January 30, 2012 || Haleakala || Pan-STARRS ||  || align=right | 1.3 km || 
|-id=131 bgcolor=#fefefe
| 505131 ||  || — || October 31, 2010 || Mount Lemmon || Mount Lemmon Survey ||  || align=right data-sort-value="0.67" | 670 m || 
|-id=132 bgcolor=#fefefe
| 505132 ||  || — || March 30, 2012 || Kitt Peak || Spacewatch || PHO || align=right | 1.1 km || 
|-id=133 bgcolor=#fefefe
| 505133 ||  || — || November 2, 2010 || Mount Lemmon || Mount Lemmon Survey ||  || align=right data-sort-value="0.87" | 870 m || 
|-id=134 bgcolor=#fefefe
| 505134 ||  || — || November 18, 2006 || Kitt Peak || Spacewatch ||  || align=right | 1.0 km || 
|-id=135 bgcolor=#fefefe
| 505135 ||  || — || April 17, 2012 || Kitt Peak || Spacewatch ||  || align=right data-sort-value="0.75" | 750 m || 
|-id=136 bgcolor=#fefefe
| 505136 ||  || — || October 19, 2006 || Kitt Peak || Spacewatch || NYS || align=right data-sort-value="0.71" | 710 m || 
|-id=137 bgcolor=#E9E9E9
| 505137 ||  || — || May 12, 2012 || Mount Lemmon || Mount Lemmon Survey ||  || align=right data-sort-value="0.89" | 890 m || 
|-id=138 bgcolor=#E9E9E9
| 505138 ||  || — || May 15, 2012 || Mount Lemmon || Mount Lemmon Survey ||  || align=right | 1.1 km || 
|-id=139 bgcolor=#E9E9E9
| 505139 ||  || — || May 28, 2008 || Mount Lemmon || Mount Lemmon Survey ||  || align=right data-sort-value="0.69" | 690 m || 
|-id=140 bgcolor=#fefefe
| 505140 ||  || — || October 22, 2006 || Kitt Peak || Spacewatch ||  || align=right data-sort-value="0.90" | 900 m || 
|-id=141 bgcolor=#E9E9E9
| 505141 ||  || — || May 20, 2012 || Mount Lemmon || Mount Lemmon Survey ||  || align=right | 1.4 km || 
|-id=142 bgcolor=#E9E9E9
| 505142 ||  || — || May 21, 2012 || Mount Lemmon || Mount Lemmon Survey ||  || align=right | 2.0 km || 
|-id=143 bgcolor=#E9E9E9
| 505143 ||  || — || January 30, 2011 || Haleakala || Pan-STARRS ||  || align=right data-sort-value="0.89" | 890 m || 
|-id=144 bgcolor=#E9E9E9
| 505144 ||  || — || May 21, 2012 || Haleakala || Pan-STARRS ||  || align=right | 1.4 km || 
|-id=145 bgcolor=#E9E9E9
| 505145 ||  || — || June 16, 2012 || Haleakala || Pan-STARRS ||  || align=right | 1.2 km || 
|-id=146 bgcolor=#E9E9E9
| 505146 ||  || — || October 3, 2003 || Kitt Peak || Spacewatch ||  || align=right | 2.2 km || 
|-id=147 bgcolor=#E9E9E9
| 505147 ||  || — || August 8, 2012 || Haleakala || Pan-STARRS ||  || align=right | 1.7 km || 
|-id=148 bgcolor=#d6d6d6
| 505148 ||  || — || May 23, 2006 || Kitt Peak || Spacewatch ||  || align=right | 2.8 km || 
|-id=149 bgcolor=#E9E9E9
| 505149 ||  || — || September 14, 1999 || Kitt Peak || Spacewatch ||  || align=right | 1.4 km || 
|-id=150 bgcolor=#E9E9E9
| 505150 ||  || — || October 23, 2008 || Mount Lemmon || Mount Lemmon Survey ||  || align=right | 1.9 km || 
|-id=151 bgcolor=#d6d6d6
| 505151 ||  || — || August 10, 2012 || Kitt Peak || Spacewatch ||  || align=right | 1.9 km || 
|-id=152 bgcolor=#d6d6d6
| 505152 ||  || — || September 4, 2007 || Mount Lemmon || Mount Lemmon Survey || KOR || align=right | 1.1 km || 
|-id=153 bgcolor=#E9E9E9
| 505153 ||  || — || September 16, 2003 || Kitt Peak || Spacewatch || GEF || align=right | 1.0 km || 
|-id=154 bgcolor=#E9E9E9
| 505154 ||  || — || August 6, 2012 || Haleakala || Pan-STARRS ||  || align=right | 2.2 km || 
|-id=155 bgcolor=#E9E9E9
| 505155 ||  || — || March 30, 2011 || Haleakala || Pan-STARRS ||  || align=right | 2.3 km || 
|-id=156 bgcolor=#d6d6d6
| 505156 ||  || — || August 14, 2012 || Kitt Peak || Spacewatch ||  || align=right | 1.8 km || 
|-id=157 bgcolor=#E9E9E9
| 505157 ||  || — || May 13, 2011 || Haleakala || Pan-STARRS ||  || align=right | 3.0 km || 
|-id=158 bgcolor=#d6d6d6
| 505158 ||  || — || April 24, 2011 || Mount Lemmon || Mount Lemmon Survey ||  || align=right | 2.6 km || 
|-id=159 bgcolor=#E9E9E9
| 505159 ||  || — || August 8, 2012 || Haleakala || Pan-STARRS ||  || align=right | 1.9 km || 
|-id=160 bgcolor=#E9E9E9
| 505160 ||  || — || August 12, 2012 || Catalina || CSS ||  || align=right | 2.8 km || 
|-id=161 bgcolor=#E9E9E9
| 505161 ||  || — || September 12, 2012 || La Sagra || OAM Obs. || GEF || align=right | 1.3 km || 
|-id=162 bgcolor=#E9E9E9
| 505162 ||  || — || September 21, 2003 || Anderson Mesa || LONEOS ||  || align=right | 2.0 km || 
|-id=163 bgcolor=#d6d6d6
| 505163 ||  || — || September 17, 2012 || Kitt Peak || Spacewatch || KOR || align=right | 1.1 km || 
|-id=164 bgcolor=#d6d6d6
| 505164 ||  || — || October 22, 2001 || Socorro || LINEAR ||  || align=right | 2.5 km || 
|-id=165 bgcolor=#d6d6d6
| 505165 ||  || — || September 17, 2012 || Mount Lemmon || Mount Lemmon Survey ||  || align=right | 2.3 km || 
|-id=166 bgcolor=#d6d6d6
| 505166 ||  || — || February 14, 2010 || Mount Lemmon || Mount Lemmon Survey ||  || align=right | 2.6 km || 
|-id=167 bgcolor=#E9E9E9
| 505167 ||  || — || September 18, 2012 || Mount Lemmon || Mount Lemmon Survey || AGN || align=right | 1.1 km || 
|-id=168 bgcolor=#E9E9E9
| 505168 ||  || — || April 5, 2011 || Kitt Peak || Spacewatch || AEO || align=right | 1.0 km || 
|-id=169 bgcolor=#FFC2E0
| 505169 ||  || — || September 22, 2012 || Socorro || LINEAR || AMO +1kmcritical || align=right | 1.0 km || 
|-id=170 bgcolor=#d6d6d6
| 505170 ||  || — || October 9, 2007 || Kitt Peak || Spacewatch ||  || align=right | 2.2 km || 
|-id=171 bgcolor=#d6d6d6
| 505171 ||  || — || September 19, 2012 || Mount Lemmon || Mount Lemmon Survey || 615 || align=right | 1.2 km || 
|-id=172 bgcolor=#fefefe
| 505172 ||  || — || February 23, 2011 || Catalina || CSS || H || align=right data-sort-value="0.65" | 650 m || 
|-id=173 bgcolor=#E9E9E9
| 505173 ||  || — || October 19, 2003 || Kitt Peak || Spacewatch ||  || align=right | 2.3 km || 
|-id=174 bgcolor=#d6d6d6
| 505174 ||  || — || April 6, 2010 || Mount Lemmon || Mount Lemmon Survey ||  || align=right | 3.1 km || 
|-id=175 bgcolor=#d6d6d6
| 505175 ||  || — || May 11, 2010 || Kitt Peak || Spacewatch ||  || align=right | 3.3 km || 
|-id=176 bgcolor=#d6d6d6
| 505176 ||  || — || September 21, 2012 || Kitt Peak || Spacewatch ||  || align=right | 2.7 km || 
|-id=177 bgcolor=#E9E9E9
| 505177 ||  || — || October 8, 2012 || Haleakala || Pan-STARRS ||  || align=right | 1.8 km || 
|-id=178 bgcolor=#FFC2E0
| 505178 ||  || — || October 8, 2012 || Haleakala || Pan-STARRS || APOPHA || align=right data-sort-value="0.47" | 470 m || 
|-id=179 bgcolor=#E9E9E9
| 505179 ||  || — || September 28, 2003 || Kitt Peak || Spacewatch || AGN || align=right data-sort-value="0.85" | 850 m || 
|-id=180 bgcolor=#d6d6d6
| 505180 ||  || — || May 25, 2006 || Mount Lemmon || Mount Lemmon Survey ||  || align=right | 2.1 km || 
|-id=181 bgcolor=#d6d6d6
| 505181 ||  || — || October 10, 2007 || Mount Lemmon || Mount Lemmon Survey ||  || align=right | 2.2 km || 
|-id=182 bgcolor=#d6d6d6
| 505182 ||  || — || June 22, 2011 || Mount Lemmon || Mount Lemmon Survey ||  || align=right | 2.6 km || 
|-id=183 bgcolor=#d6d6d6
| 505183 ||  || — || October 11, 2007 || Kitt Peak || Spacewatch ||  || align=right | 2.4 km || 
|-id=184 bgcolor=#E9E9E9
| 505184 ||  || — || September 21, 2012 || Kitt Peak || Spacewatch ||  || align=right | 1.7 km || 
|-id=185 bgcolor=#E9E9E9
| 505185 ||  || — || September 25, 2012 || Kitt Peak || Spacewatch ||  || align=right | 2.1 km || 
|-id=186 bgcolor=#d6d6d6
| 505186 ||  || — || September 21, 2012 || Kitt Peak || Spacewatch ||  || align=right | 2.1 km || 
|-id=187 bgcolor=#d6d6d6
| 505187 ||  || — || October 15, 2001 || Kitt Peak || Spacewatch ||  || align=right | 2.6 km || 
|-id=188 bgcolor=#E9E9E9
| 505188 ||  || — || September 10, 2007 || Mount Lemmon || Mount Lemmon Survey ||  || align=right | 1.8 km || 
|-id=189 bgcolor=#d6d6d6
| 505189 ||  || — || October 4, 2012 || Mount Lemmon || Mount Lemmon Survey || EOS || align=right | 1.5 km || 
|-id=190 bgcolor=#E9E9E9
| 505190 ||  || — || October 5, 2012 || Haleakala || Pan-STARRS || HOF || align=right | 2.4 km || 
|-id=191 bgcolor=#d6d6d6
| 505191 ||  || — || September 16, 2012 || Kitt Peak || Spacewatch ||  || align=right | 2.3 km || 
|-id=192 bgcolor=#d6d6d6
| 505192 ||  || — || October 30, 2002 || Kitt Peak || Spacewatch || EOS || align=right | 1.8 km || 
|-id=193 bgcolor=#d6d6d6
| 505193 ||  || — || October 8, 2012 || Mount Lemmon || Mount Lemmon Survey ||  || align=right | 2.5 km || 
|-id=194 bgcolor=#d6d6d6
| 505194 ||  || — || September 14, 2007 || Mount Lemmon || Mount Lemmon Survey ||  || align=right | 1.9 km || 
|-id=195 bgcolor=#d6d6d6
| 505195 ||  || — || October 10, 2012 || Mount Lemmon || Mount Lemmon Survey ||  || align=right | 2.7 km || 
|-id=196 bgcolor=#fefefe
| 505196 ||  || — || September 18, 2012 || Kitt Peak || Spacewatch || H || align=right data-sort-value="0.70" | 700 m || 
|-id=197 bgcolor=#E9E9E9
| 505197 ||  || — || January 14, 2010 || WISE || WISE ||  || align=right | 1.8 km || 
|-id=198 bgcolor=#d6d6d6
| 505198 ||  || — || October 8, 2012 || Mount Lemmon || Mount Lemmon Survey || BRA || align=right | 1.3 km || 
|-id=199 bgcolor=#E9E9E9
| 505199 ||  || — || March 18, 2010 || Mount Lemmon || Mount Lemmon Survey ||  || align=right | 2.0 km || 
|-id=200 bgcolor=#E9E9E9
| 505200 ||  || — || August 10, 2007 || Kitt Peak || Spacewatch || AGN || align=right | 1.1 km || 
|}

505201–505300 

|-bgcolor=#d6d6d6
| 505201 ||  || — || October 8, 2012 || Haleakala || Pan-STARRS ||  || align=right | 2.2 km || 
|-id=202 bgcolor=#d6d6d6
| 505202 ||  || — || October 10, 2007 || Kitt Peak || Spacewatch ||  || align=right | 2.0 km || 
|-id=203 bgcolor=#d6d6d6
| 505203 ||  || — || October 9, 2012 || Mount Lemmon || Mount Lemmon Survey ||  || align=right | 2.8 km || 
|-id=204 bgcolor=#d6d6d6
| 505204 ||  || — || October 9, 2012 || Mount Lemmon || Mount Lemmon Survey ||  || align=right | 2.6 km || 
|-id=205 bgcolor=#d6d6d6
| 505205 ||  || — || September 21, 2012 || Kitt Peak || Spacewatch ||  || align=right | 3.0 km || 
|-id=206 bgcolor=#E9E9E9
| 505206 ||  || — || October 7, 2012 || Haleakala || Pan-STARRS || AGN || align=right | 1.4 km || 
|-id=207 bgcolor=#fefefe
| 505207 ||  || — || October 8, 2007 || Mount Lemmon || Mount Lemmon Survey || H || align=right data-sort-value="0.53" | 530 m || 
|-id=208 bgcolor=#E9E9E9
| 505208 ||  || — || October 7, 2012 || Haleakala || Pan-STARRS || AGN || align=right | 1.2 km || 
|-id=209 bgcolor=#d6d6d6
| 505209 ||  || — || September 11, 2007 || Mount Lemmon || Mount Lemmon Survey ||  || align=right | 2.3 km || 
|-id=210 bgcolor=#d6d6d6
| 505210 ||  || — || September 17, 2006 || Kitt Peak || Spacewatch || EOS || align=right | 1.8 km || 
|-id=211 bgcolor=#d6d6d6
| 505211 ||  || — || September 21, 2012 || Mount Lemmon || Mount Lemmon Survey ||  || align=right | 1.7 km || 
|-id=212 bgcolor=#d6d6d6
| 505212 ||  || — || September 10, 2007 || Mount Lemmon || Mount Lemmon Survey ||  || align=right | 2.0 km || 
|-id=213 bgcolor=#E9E9E9
| 505213 ||  || — || October 7, 2012 || Haleakala || Pan-STARRS ||  || align=right | 1.7 km || 
|-id=214 bgcolor=#d6d6d6
| 505214 ||  || — || November 4, 2007 || Kitt Peak || Spacewatch ||  || align=right | 3.1 km || 
|-id=215 bgcolor=#d6d6d6
| 505215 ||  || — || November 7, 2007 || Mount Lemmon || Mount Lemmon Survey || EOS || align=right | 1.7 km || 
|-id=216 bgcolor=#E9E9E9
| 505216 ||  || — || September 25, 2012 || Mount Lemmon || Mount Lemmon Survey ||  || align=right | 2.1 km || 
|-id=217 bgcolor=#E9E9E9
| 505217 ||  || — || May 8, 2011 || Mount Lemmon || Mount Lemmon Survey || DOR || align=right | 2.4 km || 
|-id=218 bgcolor=#E9E9E9
| 505218 ||  || — || November 20, 2003 || Kitt Peak || Spacewatch ||  || align=right | 2.1 km || 
|-id=219 bgcolor=#d6d6d6
| 505219 ||  || — || September 23, 2012 || Kitt Peak || Spacewatch ||  || align=right | 2.3 km || 
|-id=220 bgcolor=#d6d6d6
| 505220 ||  || — || September 14, 2007 || Mount Lemmon || Mount Lemmon Survey ||  || align=right | 2.2 km || 
|-id=221 bgcolor=#E9E9E9
| 505221 ||  || — || May 24, 2011 || Haleakala || Pan-STARRS ||  || align=right | 2.1 km || 
|-id=222 bgcolor=#d6d6d6
| 505222 ||  || — || October 7, 2007 || Mount Lemmon || Mount Lemmon Survey ||  || align=right | 2.4 km || 
|-id=223 bgcolor=#FA8072
| 505223 ||  || — || April 7, 2006 || Mount Lemmon || Mount Lemmon Survey || H || align=right data-sort-value="0.46" | 460 m || 
|-id=224 bgcolor=#FA8072
| 505224 ||  || — || October 9, 2012 || Haleakala || Pan-STARRS || H || align=right data-sort-value="0.72" | 720 m || 
|-id=225 bgcolor=#fefefe
| 505225 ||  || — || September 18, 2007 || Kitt Peak || Spacewatch || H || align=right data-sort-value="0.44" | 440 m || 
|-id=226 bgcolor=#d6d6d6
| 505226 ||  || — || January 7, 2009 || Kitt Peak || Spacewatch ||  || align=right | 2.0 km || 
|-id=227 bgcolor=#d6d6d6
| 505227 ||  || — || October 10, 2007 || Mount Lemmon || Mount Lemmon Survey || EOS || align=right | 1.3 km || 
|-id=228 bgcolor=#E9E9E9
| 505228 ||  || — || October 7, 2012 || Haleakala || Pan-STARRS || MRX || align=right | 1.2 km || 
|-id=229 bgcolor=#d6d6d6
| 505229 ||  || — || November 16, 2007 || Mount Lemmon || Mount Lemmon Survey ||  || align=right | 2.2 km || 
|-id=230 bgcolor=#d6d6d6
| 505230 ||  || — || October 8, 2012 || Haleakala || Pan-STARRS ||  || align=right | 2.6 km || 
|-id=231 bgcolor=#d6d6d6
| 505231 ||  || — || October 16, 2012 || Kitt Peak || Spacewatch ||  || align=right | 2.3 km || 
|-id=232 bgcolor=#d6d6d6
| 505232 ||  || — || October 8, 2012 || Mount Lemmon || Mount Lemmon Survey ||  || align=right | 2.5 km || 
|-id=233 bgcolor=#d6d6d6
| 505233 ||  || — || November 13, 2007 || Kitt Peak || Spacewatch ||  || align=right | 3.1 km || 
|-id=234 bgcolor=#d6d6d6
| 505234 ||  || — || October 18, 2012 || Mount Lemmon || Mount Lemmon Survey ||  || align=right | 2.7 km || 
|-id=235 bgcolor=#d6d6d6
| 505235 ||  || — || October 15, 2007 || Kitt Peak || Spacewatch ||  || align=right | 2.7 km || 
|-id=236 bgcolor=#d6d6d6
| 505236 ||  || — || November 4, 2007 || Mount Lemmon || Mount Lemmon Survey || KOR || align=right | 1.1 km || 
|-id=237 bgcolor=#d6d6d6
| 505237 ||  || — || October 19, 2012 || Haleakala || Pan-STARRS || EOS || align=right | 1.6 km || 
|-id=238 bgcolor=#d6d6d6
| 505238 ||  || — || May 8, 2005 || Kitt Peak || Spacewatch ||  || align=right | 2.8 km || 
|-id=239 bgcolor=#d6d6d6
| 505239 ||  || — || October 16, 2012 || Kitt Peak || Spacewatch ||  || align=right | 2.3 km || 
|-id=240 bgcolor=#d6d6d6
| 505240 ||  || — || October 20, 2012 || Kitt Peak || Spacewatch ||  || align=right | 2.2 km || 
|-id=241 bgcolor=#E9E9E9
| 505241 ||  || — || October 19, 2003 || Kitt Peak || Spacewatch || AGN || align=right | 1.0 km || 
|-id=242 bgcolor=#d6d6d6
| 505242 ||  || — || October 17, 2012 || Haleakala || Pan-STARRS ||  || align=right | 1.9 km || 
|-id=243 bgcolor=#d6d6d6
| 505243 ||  || — || August 2, 2011 || Haleakala || Pan-STARRS || EOS || align=right | 1.4 km || 
|-id=244 bgcolor=#d6d6d6
| 505244 ||  || — || March 16, 2009 || Kitt Peak || Spacewatch ||  || align=right | 2.7 km || 
|-id=245 bgcolor=#d6d6d6
| 505245 ||  || — || October 9, 2007 || Kitt Peak || Spacewatch ||  || align=right | 2.1 km || 
|-id=246 bgcolor=#d6d6d6
| 505246 ||  || — || October 8, 2007 || Anderson Mesa || LONEOS || BRA || align=right | 1.6 km || 
|-id=247 bgcolor=#d6d6d6
| 505247 ||  || — || September 14, 2007 || Mount Lemmon || Mount Lemmon Survey ||  || align=right | 2.4 km || 
|-id=248 bgcolor=#d6d6d6
| 505248 ||  || — || September 17, 2012 || Kitt Peak || Spacewatch ||  || align=right | 3.4 km || 
|-id=249 bgcolor=#d6d6d6
| 505249 ||  || — || November 9, 2007 || Kitt Peak || Spacewatch ||  || align=right | 1.8 km || 
|-id=250 bgcolor=#d6d6d6
| 505250 ||  || — || October 22, 2012 || Haleakala || Pan-STARRS || EOS || align=right | 1.8 km || 
|-id=251 bgcolor=#d6d6d6
| 505251 ||  || — || October 22, 2012 || Haleakala || Pan-STARRS ||  || align=right | 2.9 km || 
|-id=252 bgcolor=#d6d6d6
| 505252 ||  || — || September 19, 2001 || Socorro || LINEAR ||  || align=right | 3.5 km || 
|-id=253 bgcolor=#d6d6d6
| 505253 ||  || — || October 22, 2012 || Haleakala || Pan-STARRS ||  || align=right | 2.9 km || 
|-id=254 bgcolor=#d6d6d6
| 505254 ||  || — || September 14, 2007 || Mount Lemmon || Mount Lemmon Survey ||  || align=right | 2.2 km || 
|-id=255 bgcolor=#E9E9E9
| 505255 ||  || — || October 8, 2012 || Haleakala || Pan-STARRS || HNS || align=right | 1.2 km || 
|-id=256 bgcolor=#d6d6d6
| 505256 ||  || — || January 20, 2009 || Mount Lemmon || Mount Lemmon Survey || EOS || align=right | 1.7 km || 
|-id=257 bgcolor=#d6d6d6
| 505257 ||  || — || June 29, 2005 || Kitt Peak || Spacewatch ||  || align=right | 3.1 km || 
|-id=258 bgcolor=#d6d6d6
| 505258 ||  || — || October 8, 2012 || Mount Lemmon || Mount Lemmon Survey ||  || align=right | 2.8 km || 
|-id=259 bgcolor=#d6d6d6
| 505259 ||  || — || October 10, 2012 || Kitt Peak || Spacewatch ||  || align=right | 2.7 km || 
|-id=260 bgcolor=#d6d6d6
| 505260 ||  || — || November 2, 2007 || Kitt Peak || Spacewatch ||  || align=right | 2.0 km || 
|-id=261 bgcolor=#fefefe
| 505261 ||  || — || January 30, 2008 || Mount Lemmon || Mount Lemmon Survey || H || align=right data-sort-value="0.70" | 700 m || 
|-id=262 bgcolor=#fefefe
| 505262 ||  || — || February 10, 2011 || Catalina || CSS || H || align=right data-sort-value="0.64" | 640 m || 
|-id=263 bgcolor=#fefefe
| 505263 ||  || — || October 10, 2012 || Haleakala || Pan-STARRS || H || align=right data-sort-value="0.53" | 530 m || 
|-id=264 bgcolor=#fefefe
| 505264 ||  || — || December 4, 2007 || Catalina || CSS || H || align=right data-sort-value="0.65" | 650 m || 
|-id=265 bgcolor=#E9E9E9
| 505265 ||  || — || August 26, 2012 || Kitt Peak || Spacewatch ||  || align=right | 2.0 km || 
|-id=266 bgcolor=#d6d6d6
| 505266 ||  || — || October 6, 2012 || Haleakala || Pan-STARRS ||  || align=right | 2.4 km || 
|-id=267 bgcolor=#E9E9E9
| 505267 ||  || — || October 12, 1994 || Kitt Peak || Spacewatch ||  || align=right | 2.6 km || 
|-id=268 bgcolor=#FA8072
| 505268 ||  || — || October 23, 2012 || Mount Lemmon || Mount Lemmon Survey || H || align=right data-sort-value="0.64" | 640 m || 
|-id=269 bgcolor=#fefefe
| 505269 ||  || — || November 5, 2012 || Kitt Peak || Spacewatch || H || align=right data-sort-value="0.65" | 650 m || 
|-id=270 bgcolor=#d6d6d6
| 505270 ||  || — || September 17, 2006 || Kitt Peak || Spacewatch ||  || align=right | 2.7 km || 
|-id=271 bgcolor=#FA8072
| 505271 ||  || — || March 31, 2011 || Haleakala || Pan-STARRS || H || align=right data-sort-value="0.39" | 390 m || 
|-id=272 bgcolor=#fefefe
| 505272 ||  || — || November 6, 2012 || Haleakala || Pan-STARRS || H || align=right data-sort-value="0.72" | 720 m || 
|-id=273 bgcolor=#d6d6d6
| 505273 ||  || — || October 21, 2012 || Haleakala || Pan-STARRS ||  || align=right | 3.0 km || 
|-id=274 bgcolor=#fefefe
| 505274 ||  || — || April 30, 2011 || Haleakala || Pan-STARRS || H || align=right data-sort-value="0.65" | 650 m || 
|-id=275 bgcolor=#fefefe
| 505275 ||  || — || May 19, 2006 || Catalina || CSS || H || align=right data-sort-value="0.62" | 620 m || 
|-id=276 bgcolor=#fefefe
| 505276 ||  || — || April 14, 2011 || Haleakala || Pan-STARRS || H || align=right data-sort-value="0.52" | 520 m || 
|-id=277 bgcolor=#d6d6d6
| 505277 ||  || — || October 20, 2012 || Mount Lemmon || Mount Lemmon Survey ||  || align=right | 2.4 km || 
|-id=278 bgcolor=#fefefe
| 505278 ||  || — || November 5, 2007 || Kitt Peak || Spacewatch || H || align=right data-sort-value="0.74" | 740 m || 
|-id=279 bgcolor=#d6d6d6
| 505279 ||  || — || August 4, 2011 || La Sagra || OAM Obs. ||  || align=right | 3.2 km || 
|-id=280 bgcolor=#d6d6d6
| 505280 ||  || — || September 16, 2012 || Mount Lemmon || Mount Lemmon Survey ||  || align=right | 2.2 km || 
|-id=281 bgcolor=#d6d6d6
| 505281 ||  || — || October 18, 2012 || Haleakala || Pan-STARRS ||  || align=right | 2.5 km || 
|-id=282 bgcolor=#d6d6d6
| 505282 ||  || — || October 20, 2012 || Mount Lemmon || Mount Lemmon Survey ||  || align=right | 2.4 km || 
|-id=283 bgcolor=#d6d6d6
| 505283 ||  || — || June 14, 2010 || Mount Lemmon || Mount Lemmon Survey || ARM || align=right | 2.9 km || 
|-id=284 bgcolor=#d6d6d6
| 505284 ||  || — || October 22, 2012 || Haleakala || Pan-STARRS ||  || align=right | 3.0 km || 
|-id=285 bgcolor=#fefefe
| 505285 ||  || — || October 22, 2012 || Haleakala || Pan-STARRS || H || align=right data-sort-value="0.35" | 350 m || 
|-id=286 bgcolor=#d6d6d6
| 505286 ||  || — || October 22, 2012 || Haleakala || Pan-STARRS ||  || align=right | 3.1 km || 
|-id=287 bgcolor=#d6d6d6
| 505287 ||  || — || March 11, 2010 || WISE || WISE ||  || align=right | 3.4 km || 
|-id=288 bgcolor=#d6d6d6
| 505288 ||  || — || October 25, 2012 || Kitt Peak || Spacewatch ||  || align=right | 2.9 km || 
|-id=289 bgcolor=#d6d6d6
| 505289 ||  || — || October 15, 2012 || Kitt Peak || Spacewatch ||  || align=right | 3.4 km || 
|-id=290 bgcolor=#d6d6d6
| 505290 ||  || — || October 7, 2012 || Kitt Peak || Spacewatch ||  || align=right | 2.2 km || 
|-id=291 bgcolor=#d6d6d6
| 505291 ||  || — || November 12, 2012 || Mount Lemmon || Mount Lemmon Survey ||  || align=right | 3.7 km || 
|-id=292 bgcolor=#d6d6d6
| 505292 ||  || — || October 22, 2012 || Haleakala || Pan-STARRS ||  || align=right | 3.0 km || 
|-id=293 bgcolor=#d6d6d6
| 505293 ||  || — || December 31, 2007 || Mount Lemmon || Mount Lemmon Survey ||  || align=right | 1.9 km || 
|-id=294 bgcolor=#d6d6d6
| 505294 ||  || — || October 9, 2012 || Mount Lemmon || Mount Lemmon Survey ||  || align=right | 2.6 km || 
|-id=295 bgcolor=#d6d6d6
| 505295 ||  || — || October 9, 2012 || Mount Lemmon || Mount Lemmon Survey ||  || align=right | 2.2 km || 
|-id=296 bgcolor=#d6d6d6
| 505296 ||  || — || August 29, 2006 || Kitt Peak || Spacewatch ||  || align=right | 1.8 km || 
|-id=297 bgcolor=#d6d6d6
| 505297 ||  || — || December 3, 2007 || Kitt Peak || Spacewatch ||  || align=right | 2.0 km || 
|-id=298 bgcolor=#d6d6d6
| 505298 ||  || — || November 20, 2001 || Socorro || LINEAR ||  || align=right | 2.8 km || 
|-id=299 bgcolor=#d6d6d6
| 505299 ||  || — || November 6, 2012 || Kitt Peak || Spacewatch || EOS || align=right | 1.6 km || 
|-id=300 bgcolor=#d6d6d6
| 505300 ||  || — || November 6, 2012 || Kitt Peak || Spacewatch ||  || align=right | 3.5 km || 
|}

505301–505400 

|-bgcolor=#fefefe
| 505301 ||  || — || April 24, 2011 || Haleakala || Pan-STARRS || H || align=right data-sort-value="0.80" | 800 m || 
|-id=302 bgcolor=#d6d6d6
| 505302 ||  || — || January 16, 2008 || Mount Lemmon || Mount Lemmon Survey ||  || align=right | 2.7 km || 
|-id=303 bgcolor=#d6d6d6
| 505303 ||  || — || November 7, 2007 || Kitt Peak || Spacewatch ||  || align=right | 2.2 km || 
|-id=304 bgcolor=#d6d6d6
| 505304 ||  || — || December 3, 2012 || Mount Lemmon || Mount Lemmon Survey ||  || align=right | 2.2 km || 
|-id=305 bgcolor=#d6d6d6
| 505305 ||  || — || January 1, 2008 || Kitt Peak || Spacewatch ||  || align=right | 2.2 km || 
|-id=306 bgcolor=#d6d6d6
| 505306 ||  || — || September 19, 2011 || Haleakala || Pan-STARRS ||  || align=right | 3.3 km || 
|-id=307 bgcolor=#d6d6d6
| 505307 ||  || — || December 3, 2012 || Mount Lemmon || Mount Lemmon Survey ||  || align=right | 3.5 km || 
|-id=308 bgcolor=#d6d6d6
| 505308 ||  || — || November 13, 2007 || Kitt Peak || Spacewatch ||  || align=right | 2.0 km || 
|-id=309 bgcolor=#fefefe
| 505309 ||  || — || December 4, 2012 || Kitt Peak || Spacewatch || H || align=right data-sort-value="0.64" | 640 m || 
|-id=310 bgcolor=#fefefe
| 505310 ||  || — || May 8, 2011 || Mount Lemmon || Mount Lemmon Survey || H || align=right data-sort-value="0.60" | 600 m || 
|-id=311 bgcolor=#d6d6d6
| 505311 ||  || — || October 21, 2012 || Haleakala || Pan-STARRS ||  || align=right | 1.7 km || 
|-id=312 bgcolor=#d6d6d6
| 505312 ||  || — || October 17, 2012 || Mount Lemmon || Mount Lemmon Survey ||  || align=right | 2.8 km || 
|-id=313 bgcolor=#d6d6d6
| 505313 ||  || — || September 19, 2006 || Kitt Peak || Spacewatch ||  || align=right | 1.9 km || 
|-id=314 bgcolor=#d6d6d6
| 505314 ||  || — || November 17, 2006 || Mount Lemmon || Mount Lemmon Survey ||  || align=right | 2.2 km || 
|-id=315 bgcolor=#d6d6d6
| 505315 ||  || — || February 28, 2009 || Kitt Peak || Spacewatch ||  || align=right | 2.1 km || 
|-id=316 bgcolor=#d6d6d6
| 505316 ||  || — || December 19, 2007 || Mount Lemmon || Mount Lemmon Survey || EOS || align=right | 1.5 km || 
|-id=317 bgcolor=#fefefe
| 505317 ||  || — || December 10, 2012 || Haleakala || Pan-STARRS || H || align=right data-sort-value="0.54" | 540 m || 
|-id=318 bgcolor=#d6d6d6
| 505318 ||  || — || December 4, 2012 || Mount Lemmon || Mount Lemmon Survey ||  || align=right | 4.0 km || 
|-id=319 bgcolor=#d6d6d6
| 505319 ||  || — || October 19, 2007 || Mount Lemmon || Mount Lemmon Survey ||  || align=right | 2.8 km || 
|-id=320 bgcolor=#d6d6d6
| 505320 ||  || — || December 18, 2001 || Socorro || LINEAR ||  || align=right | 2.4 km || 
|-id=321 bgcolor=#d6d6d6
| 505321 ||  || — || September 18, 2006 || Kitt Peak || Spacewatch || HYG || align=right | 2.6 km || 
|-id=322 bgcolor=#d6d6d6
| 505322 ||  || — || September 20, 2011 || Haleakala || Pan-STARRS ||  || align=right | 3.6 km || 
|-id=323 bgcolor=#d6d6d6
| 505323 ||  || — || December 19, 2001 || Socorro || LINEAR ||  || align=right | 2.9 km || 
|-id=324 bgcolor=#d6d6d6
| 505324 ||  || — || July 26, 2011 || Haleakala || Pan-STARRS ||  || align=right | 2.8 km || 
|-id=325 bgcolor=#fefefe
| 505325 ||  || — || December 10, 2004 || Socorro || LINEAR || H || align=right data-sort-value="0.64" | 640 m || 
|-id=326 bgcolor=#fefefe
| 505326 ||  || — || December 21, 2012 || Haleakala || Pan-STARRS || H || align=right data-sort-value="0.64" | 640 m || 
|-id=327 bgcolor=#d6d6d6
| 505327 ||  || — || September 27, 2012 || Haleakala || Pan-STARRS || Tj (2.98) || align=right | 3.4 km || 
|-id=328 bgcolor=#d6d6d6
| 505328 ||  || — || December 9, 2012 || Haleakala || Pan-STARRS || EOS || align=right | 1.8 km || 
|-id=329 bgcolor=#d6d6d6
| 505329 ||  || — || August 23, 2011 || Haleakala || Pan-STARRS ||  || align=right | 2.3 km || 
|-id=330 bgcolor=#d6d6d6
| 505330 ||  || — || November 7, 2007 || Mount Lemmon || Mount Lemmon Survey ||  || align=right | 2.5 km || 
|-id=331 bgcolor=#d6d6d6
| 505331 ||  || — || November 20, 2006 || Catalina || CSS ||  || align=right | 2.6 km || 
|-id=332 bgcolor=#d6d6d6
| 505332 ||  || — || February 8, 2002 || Kitt Peak || Spacewatch ||  || align=right | 2.5 km || 
|-id=333 bgcolor=#fefefe
| 505333 ||  || — || January 1, 2013 || Haleakala || Pan-STARRS || H || align=right data-sort-value="0.56" | 560 m || 
|-id=334 bgcolor=#d6d6d6
| 505334 ||  || — || February 12, 2008 || Mount Lemmon || Mount Lemmon Survey ||  || align=right | 2.7 km || 
|-id=335 bgcolor=#FA8072
| 505335 ||  || — || October 15, 2004 || Mount Lemmon || Mount Lemmon Survey ||  || align=right data-sort-value="0.44" | 440 m || 
|-id=336 bgcolor=#d6d6d6
| 505336 ||  || — || November 23, 2006 || Mount Lemmon || Mount Lemmon Survey ||  || align=right | 2.7 km || 
|-id=337 bgcolor=#fefefe
| 505337 ||  || — || January 19, 2005 || Kitt Peak || Spacewatch || H || align=right data-sort-value="0.54" | 540 m || 
|-id=338 bgcolor=#d6d6d6
| 505338 ||  || — || September 19, 2011 || Haleakala || Pan-STARRS || TIR || align=right | 2.8 km || 
|-id=339 bgcolor=#fefefe
| 505339 ||  || — || January 14, 2013 || Catalina || CSS || H || align=right data-sort-value="0.69" | 690 m || 
|-id=340 bgcolor=#d6d6d6
| 505340 ||  || — || January 9, 2013 || Kitt Peak || Spacewatch ||  || align=right | 2.6 km || 
|-id=341 bgcolor=#fefefe
| 505341 ||  || — || December 24, 2012 || Haleakala || Pan-STARRS || H || align=right data-sort-value="0.57" | 570 m || 
|-id=342 bgcolor=#d6d6d6
| 505342 ||  || — || February 10, 2008 || Kitt Peak || Spacewatch ||  || align=right | 2.7 km || 
|-id=343 bgcolor=#d6d6d6
| 505343 ||  || — || March 9, 2008 || Mount Lemmon || Mount Lemmon Survey || LIX || align=right | 3.1 km || 
|-id=344 bgcolor=#d6d6d6
| 505344 ||  || — || June 9, 2011 || Haleakala || Pan-STARRS || LIX || align=right | 3.8 km || 
|-id=345 bgcolor=#fefefe
| 505345 ||  || — || January 8, 2013 || Haleakala || Pan-STARRS || H || align=right data-sort-value="0.57" | 570 m || 
|-id=346 bgcolor=#fefefe
| 505346 ||  || — || January 9, 2013 || Mount Lemmon || Mount Lemmon Survey || H || align=right data-sort-value="0.77" | 770 m || 
|-id=347 bgcolor=#d6d6d6
| 505347 ||  || — || September 27, 2012 || Haleakala || Pan-STARRS ||  || align=right | 4.1 km || 
|-id=348 bgcolor=#FA8072
| 505348 ||  || — || January 17, 2013 || Catalina || CSS ||  || align=right data-sort-value="0.50" | 500 m || 
|-id=349 bgcolor=#FA8072
| 505349 ||  || — || July 20, 2006 || Siding Spring || SSS || H || align=right data-sort-value="0.67" | 670 m || 
|-id=350 bgcolor=#d6d6d6
| 505350 ||  || — || November 27, 2000 || Kitt Peak || Spacewatch ||  || align=right | 2.8 km || 
|-id=351 bgcolor=#fefefe
| 505351 ||  || — || August 21, 2011 || Haleakala || Pan-STARRS || H || align=right data-sort-value="0.71" | 710 m || 
|-id=352 bgcolor=#fefefe
| 505352 ||  || — || August 21, 2001 || Socorro || LINEAR || H || align=right data-sort-value="0.77" | 770 m || 
|-id=353 bgcolor=#fefefe
| 505353 ||  || — || January 14, 2013 || Mount Lemmon || Mount Lemmon Survey || H || align=right data-sort-value="0.52" | 520 m || 
|-id=354 bgcolor=#fefefe
| 505354 ||  || — || February 8, 2013 || Haleakala || Pan-STARRS ||  || align=right data-sort-value="0.78" | 780 m || 
|-id=355 bgcolor=#fefefe
| 505355 ||  || — || February 13, 2013 || Haleakala || Pan-STARRS ||  || align=right data-sort-value="0.48" | 480 m || 
|-id=356 bgcolor=#d6d6d6
| 505356 ||  || — || January 10, 2013 || Kitt Peak || Spacewatch ||  || align=right | 3.1 km || 
|-id=357 bgcolor=#d6d6d6
| 505357 ||  || — || September 26, 2011 || Haleakala || Pan-STARRS || THB || align=right | 2.2 km || 
|-id=358 bgcolor=#fefefe
| 505358 ||  || — || March 7, 2013 || Kitt Peak || Spacewatch || H || align=right data-sort-value="0.82" | 820 m || 
|-id=359 bgcolor=#d6d6d6
| 505359 ||  || — || January 26, 2012 || Haleakala || Pan-STARRS || 3:2 || align=right | 5.1 km || 
|-id=360 bgcolor=#fefefe
| 505360 ||  || — || September 15, 2004 || Kitt Peak || Spacewatch ||  || align=right data-sort-value="0.51" | 510 m || 
|-id=361 bgcolor=#fefefe
| 505361 ||  || — || March 3, 2013 || Kitt Peak || Spacewatch || H || align=right data-sort-value="0.48" | 480 m || 
|-id=362 bgcolor=#d6d6d6
| 505362 ||  || — || March 13, 2007 || Catalina || CSS || Tj (2.99) || align=right | 3.4 km || 
|-id=363 bgcolor=#E9E9E9
| 505363 ||  || — || March 24, 2013 || Mount Lemmon || Mount Lemmon Survey ||  || align=right data-sort-value="0.95" | 950 m || 
|-id=364 bgcolor=#fefefe
| 505364 ||  || — || March 5, 2006 || Kitt Peak || Spacewatch ||  || align=right data-sort-value="0.64" | 640 m || 
|-id=365 bgcolor=#fefefe
| 505365 ||  || — || March 5, 2013 || Kitt Peak || Spacewatch || H || align=right data-sort-value="0.67" | 670 m || 
|-id=366 bgcolor=#E9E9E9
| 505366 ||  || — || February 21, 2013 || Haleakala || Pan-STARRS ||  || align=right | 1.7 km || 
|-id=367 bgcolor=#fefefe
| 505367 ||  || — || April 10, 2013 || Haleakala || Pan-STARRS ||  || align=right data-sort-value="0.53" | 530 m || 
|-id=368 bgcolor=#fefefe
| 505368 ||  || — || April 20, 2013 || Mount Lemmon || Mount Lemmon Survey ||  || align=right | 1.0 km || 
|-id=369 bgcolor=#fefefe
| 505369 ||  || — || April 16, 2013 || Siding Spring || SSS ||  || align=right data-sort-value="0.71" | 710 m || 
|-id=370 bgcolor=#FA8072
| 505370 ||  || — || April 9, 2013 || Haleakala || Pan-STARRS ||  || align=right data-sort-value="0.86" | 860 m || 
|-id=371 bgcolor=#fefefe
| 505371 ||  || — || August 10, 2007 || Kitt Peak || Spacewatch ||  || align=right data-sort-value="0.58" | 580 m || 
|-id=372 bgcolor=#fefefe
| 505372 ||  || — || August 9, 2007 || Socorro || LINEAR ||  || align=right data-sort-value="0.50" | 500 m || 
|-id=373 bgcolor=#fefefe
| 505373 ||  || — || April 9, 2013 || Haleakala || Pan-STARRS ||  || align=right data-sort-value="0.57" | 570 m || 
|-id=374 bgcolor=#fefefe
| 505374 ||  || — || April 9, 2013 || Haleakala || Pan-STARRS ||  || align=right data-sort-value="0.60" | 600 m || 
|-id=375 bgcolor=#E9E9E9
| 505375 ||  || — || April 9, 2013 || Haleakala || Pan-STARRS ||  || align=right | 1.4 km || 
|-id=376 bgcolor=#d6d6d6
| 505376 ||  || — || March 9, 2005 || Mount Lemmon || Mount Lemmon Survey || (6124)3:2 || align=right | 3.6 km || 
|-id=377 bgcolor=#fefefe
| 505377 ||  || — || April 9, 2013 || Haleakala || Pan-STARRS ||  || align=right data-sort-value="0.65" | 650 m || 
|-id=378 bgcolor=#d6d6d6
| 505378 ||  || — || April 14, 2007 || Kitt Peak || Spacewatch || 7:4 || align=right | 3.4 km || 
|-id=379 bgcolor=#fefefe
| 505379 ||  || — || September 10, 2007 || Kitt Peak || Spacewatch ||  || align=right data-sort-value="0.55" | 550 m || 
|-id=380 bgcolor=#fefefe
| 505380 ||  || — || May 9, 2013 || Haleakala || Pan-STARRS ||  || align=right data-sort-value="0.51" | 510 m || 
|-id=381 bgcolor=#fefefe
| 505381 ||  || — || June 11, 2010 || WISE || WISE ||  || align=right data-sort-value="0.66" | 660 m || 
|-id=382 bgcolor=#fefefe
| 505382 ||  || — || May 2, 2003 || Kitt Peak || Spacewatch ||  || align=right data-sort-value="0.62" | 620 m || 
|-id=383 bgcolor=#fefefe
| 505383 ||  || — || June 18, 2013 || Haleakala || Pan-STARRS ||  || align=right data-sort-value="0.88" | 880 m || 
|-id=384 bgcolor=#fefefe
| 505384 ||  || — || June 7, 2013 || Haleakala || Pan-STARRS ||  || align=right data-sort-value="0.67" | 670 m || 
|-id=385 bgcolor=#fefefe
| 505385 ||  || — || July 28, 2013 || Kitt Peak || Spacewatch ||  || align=right data-sort-value="0.78" | 780 m || 
|-id=386 bgcolor=#fefefe
| 505386 ||  || — || July 2, 2013 || Haleakala || Pan-STARRS ||  || align=right data-sort-value="0.85" | 850 m || 
|-id=387 bgcolor=#fefefe
| 505387 ||  || — || January 19, 2012 || Haleakala || Pan-STARRS ||  || align=right data-sort-value="0.79" | 790 m || 
|-id=388 bgcolor=#fefefe
| 505388 ||  || — || December 30, 2007 || Mount Lemmon || Mount Lemmon Survey || V || align=right data-sort-value="0.65" | 650 m || 
|-id=389 bgcolor=#fefefe
| 505389 ||  || — || November 19, 2007 || Mount Lemmon || Mount Lemmon Survey ||  || align=right data-sort-value="0.74" | 740 m || 
|-id=390 bgcolor=#fefefe
| 505390 ||  || — || September 14, 1998 || Kitt Peak || Spacewatch ||  || align=right data-sort-value="0.59" | 590 m || 
|-id=391 bgcolor=#fefefe
| 505391 ||  || — || March 13, 2012 || Mount Lemmon || Mount Lemmon Survey ||  || align=right data-sort-value="0.65" | 650 m || 
|-id=392 bgcolor=#fefefe
| 505392 ||  || — || August 9, 2013 || Kitt Peak || Spacewatch ||  || align=right data-sort-value="0.71" | 710 m || 
|-id=393 bgcolor=#E9E9E9
| 505393 ||  || — || October 26, 2005 || Kitt Peak || Spacewatch ||  || align=right data-sort-value="0.75" | 750 m || 
|-id=394 bgcolor=#fefefe
| 505394 ||  || — || February 28, 2012 || Haleakala || Pan-STARRS ||  || align=right data-sort-value="0.88" | 880 m || 
|-id=395 bgcolor=#fefefe
| 505395 ||  || — || August 12, 2013 || Kitt Peak || Spacewatch ||  || align=right data-sort-value="0.65" | 650 m || 
|-id=396 bgcolor=#fefefe
| 505396 ||  || — || August 29, 2013 || Haleakala || Pan-STARRS ||  || align=right data-sort-value="0.75" | 750 m || 
|-id=397 bgcolor=#fefefe
| 505397 ||  || — || May 7, 2005 || Kitt Peak || Spacewatch || MAS || align=right data-sort-value="0.56" | 560 m || 
|-id=398 bgcolor=#fefefe
| 505398 ||  || — || November 17, 2006 || Kitt Peak || Spacewatch || MAS || align=right data-sort-value="0.61" | 610 m || 
|-id=399 bgcolor=#fefefe
| 505399 ||  || — || October 13, 2010 || Mount Lemmon || Mount Lemmon Survey ||  || align=right data-sort-value="0.69" | 690 m || 
|-id=400 bgcolor=#fefefe
| 505400 ||  || — || February 13, 2008 || Kitt Peak || Spacewatch ||  || align=right data-sort-value="0.77" | 770 m || 
|}

505401–505500 

|-bgcolor=#fefefe
| 505401 ||  || — || June 19, 2013 || Mount Lemmon || Mount Lemmon Survey ||  || align=right data-sort-value="0.64" | 640 m || 
|-id=402 bgcolor=#E9E9E9
| 505402 ||  || — || August 27, 2013 || Haleakala || Pan-STARRS ||  || align=right data-sort-value="0.98" | 980 m || 
|-id=403 bgcolor=#fefefe
| 505403 ||  || — || March 9, 2005 || Mount Lemmon || Mount Lemmon Survey ||  || align=right data-sort-value="0.72" | 720 m || 
|-id=404 bgcolor=#E9E9E9
| 505404 ||  || — || August 26, 2013 || Haleakala || Pan-STARRS ||  || align=right data-sort-value="0.99" | 990 m || 
|-id=405 bgcolor=#fefefe
| 505405 ||  || — || March 16, 2012 || Mount Lemmon || Mount Lemmon Survey ||  || align=right data-sort-value="0.70" | 700 m || 
|-id=406 bgcolor=#fefefe
| 505406 ||  || — || October 21, 2006 || Kitt Peak || Spacewatch ||  || align=right data-sort-value="0.65" | 650 m || 
|-id=407 bgcolor=#E9E9E9
| 505407 ||  || — || August 25, 2005 || Campo Imperatore || CINEOS ||  || align=right data-sort-value="0.62" | 620 m || 
|-id=408 bgcolor=#fefefe
| 505408 ||  || — || January 30, 2011 || Haleakala || Pan-STARRS ||  || align=right data-sort-value="0.97" | 970 m || 
|-id=409 bgcolor=#fefefe
| 505409 ||  || — || July 14, 2013 || Haleakala || Pan-STARRS ||  || align=right data-sort-value="0.59" | 590 m || 
|-id=410 bgcolor=#fefefe
| 505410 ||  || — || March 15, 2012 || Mount Lemmon || Mount Lemmon Survey ||  || align=right data-sort-value="0.78" | 780 m || 
|-id=411 bgcolor=#fefefe
| 505411 ||  || — || June 19, 2009 || Kitt Peak || Spacewatch ||  || align=right data-sort-value="0.91" | 910 m || 
|-id=412 bgcolor=#C2E0FF
| 505412 ||  || — || August 9, 2013 || Haleakala || Pan-STARRS || other TNOcritical || align=right | 195 km || 
|-id=413 bgcolor=#fefefe
| 505413 ||  || — || December 1, 2006 || Mount Lemmon || Mount Lemmon Survey ||  || align=right data-sort-value="0.83" | 830 m || 
|-id=414 bgcolor=#fefefe
| 505414 ||  || — || November 4, 2002 || Kitt Peak || Spacewatch || NYS || align=right data-sort-value="0.59" | 590 m || 
|-id=415 bgcolor=#fefefe
| 505415 ||  || — || August 15, 2013 || Haleakala || Pan-STARRS ||  || align=right data-sort-value="0.84" | 840 m || 
|-id=416 bgcolor=#FA8072
| 505416 ||  || — || September 18, 1998 || Anderson Mesa || LONEOS ||  || align=right | 2.3 km || 
|-id=417 bgcolor=#fefefe
| 505417 ||  || — || March 16, 2012 || Mount Lemmon || Mount Lemmon Survey ||  || align=right data-sort-value="0.87" | 870 m || 
|-id=418 bgcolor=#fefefe
| 505418 ||  || — || September 3, 2013 || Catalina || CSS ||  || align=right data-sort-value="0.81" | 810 m || 
|-id=419 bgcolor=#E9E9E9
| 505419 ||  || — || September 2, 2013 || Catalina || CSS ||  || align=right | 1.6 km || 
|-id=420 bgcolor=#fefefe
| 505420 ||  || — || February 8, 2008 || Kitt Peak || Spacewatch || V || align=right data-sort-value="0.67" | 670 m || 
|-id=421 bgcolor=#fefefe
| 505421 ||  || — || July 25, 2009 || La Sagra || OAM Obs. ||  || align=right | 1.1 km || 
|-id=422 bgcolor=#fefefe
| 505422 ||  || — || January 30, 2011 || Haleakala || Pan-STARRS || V || align=right data-sort-value="0.69" | 690 m || 
|-id=423 bgcolor=#fefefe
| 505423 ||  || — || March 27, 2008 || Mount Lemmon || Mount Lemmon Survey || NYS || align=right data-sort-value="0.68" | 680 m || 
|-id=424 bgcolor=#fefefe
| 505424 ||  || — || February 5, 2011 || Haleakala || Pan-STARRS || NYS || align=right data-sort-value="0.67" | 670 m || 
|-id=425 bgcolor=#fefefe
| 505425 ||  || — || September 6, 2013 || Catalina || CSS ||  || align=right data-sort-value="0.69" | 690 m || 
|-id=426 bgcolor=#fefefe
| 505426 ||  || — || January 24, 2007 || Mount Lemmon || Mount Lemmon Survey ||  || align=right data-sort-value="0.75" | 750 m || 
|-id=427 bgcolor=#E9E9E9
| 505427 ||  || — || September 17, 2009 || Kitt Peak || Spacewatch ||  || align=right data-sort-value="0.76" | 760 m || 
|-id=428 bgcolor=#fefefe
| 505428 ||  || — || December 27, 2006 || Mount Lemmon || Mount Lemmon Survey ||  || align=right data-sort-value="0.71" | 710 m || 
|-id=429 bgcolor=#fefefe
| 505429 ||  || — || September 2, 1998 || Kitt Peak || Spacewatch || NYS || align=right data-sort-value="0.53" | 530 m || 
|-id=430 bgcolor=#E9E9E9
| 505430 ||  || — || August 27, 2013 || Haleakala || Pan-STARRS ||  || align=right | 1.5 km || 
|-id=431 bgcolor=#E9E9E9
| 505431 ||  || — || October 30, 2009 || Mount Lemmon || Mount Lemmon Survey ||  || align=right data-sort-value="0.62" | 620 m || 
|-id=432 bgcolor=#fefefe
| 505432 ||  || — || September 6, 2013 || Kitt Peak || Spacewatch ||  || align=right data-sort-value="0.70" | 700 m || 
|-id=433 bgcolor=#fefefe
| 505433 ||  || — || March 16, 2012 || Haleakala || Pan-STARRS ||  || align=right data-sort-value="0.87" | 870 m || 
|-id=434 bgcolor=#fefefe
| 505434 ||  || — || January 30, 2011 || Haleakala || Pan-STARRS || MAS || align=right data-sort-value="0.67" | 670 m || 
|-id=435 bgcolor=#fefefe
| 505435 ||  || — || September 5, 2013 || Catalina || CSS ||  || align=right | 1.0 km || 
|-id=436 bgcolor=#fefefe
| 505436 ||  || — || January 17, 2007 || Kitt Peak || Spacewatch ||  || align=right data-sort-value="0.67" | 670 m || 
|-id=437 bgcolor=#fefefe
| 505437 ||  || — || January 27, 2007 || Kitt Peak || Spacewatch ||  || align=right data-sort-value="0.76" | 760 m || 
|-id=438 bgcolor=#E9E9E9
| 505438 ||  || — || October 14, 2009 || Mount Lemmon || Mount Lemmon Survey ||  || align=right data-sort-value="0.82" | 820 m || 
|-id=439 bgcolor=#E9E9E9
| 505439 ||  || — || October 27, 2005 || Kitt Peak || Spacewatch ||  || align=right data-sort-value="0.64" | 640 m || 
|-id=440 bgcolor=#E9E9E9
| 505440 ||  || — || October 22, 2009 || Mount Lemmon || Mount Lemmon Survey || MAR || align=right data-sort-value="0.95" | 950 m || 
|-id=441 bgcolor=#E9E9E9
| 505441 ||  || — || October 18, 2009 || Mount Lemmon || Mount Lemmon Survey ||  || align=right | 1.1 km || 
|-id=442 bgcolor=#d6d6d6
| 505442 ||  || — || February 3, 2009 || Catalina || CSS || Tj (2.98) || align=right | 3.2 km || 
|-id=443 bgcolor=#fefefe
| 505443 ||  || — || January 28, 2011 || Catalina || CSS ||  || align=right | 1.1 km || 
|-id=444 bgcolor=#fefefe
| 505444 ||  || — || April 5, 2008 || Mount Lemmon || Mount Lemmon Survey || V || align=right data-sort-value="0.66" | 660 m || 
|-id=445 bgcolor=#fefefe
| 505445 ||  || — || January 8, 2011 || Mount Lemmon || Mount Lemmon Survey ||  || align=right data-sort-value="0.68" | 680 m || 
|-id=446 bgcolor=#C2E0FF
| 505446 ||  || — || August 5, 2013 || Mauna Kea || OSSOS || cubewano (cold)critical || align=right | 154 km || 
|-id=447 bgcolor=#C2E0FF
| 505447 ||  || — || August 5, 2013 || Mauna Kea || OSSOS || cubewano (cold)mooncritical || align=right | 225 km || 
|-id=448 bgcolor=#C2E0FF
| 505448 ||  || — || August 5, 2013 || Mauna Kea || OSSOS || cubewano (hot)critical || align=right | 247 km || 
|-id=449 bgcolor=#fefefe
| 505449 ||  || — || September 21, 2009 || Mount Lemmon || Mount Lemmon Survey ||  || align=right data-sort-value="0.86" | 860 m || 
|-id=450 bgcolor=#fefefe
| 505450 ||  || — || September 1, 2013 || Mount Lemmon || Mount Lemmon Survey ||  || align=right data-sort-value="0.74" | 740 m || 
|-id=451 bgcolor=#E9E9E9
| 505451 ||  || — || March 5, 2011 || Kitt Peak || Spacewatch || HNS || align=right | 1.2 km || 
|-id=452 bgcolor=#fefefe
| 505452 ||  || — || February 12, 2008 || Mount Lemmon || Mount Lemmon Survey ||  || align=right data-sort-value="0.91" | 910 m || 
|-id=453 bgcolor=#fefefe
| 505453 ||  || — || June 20, 2013 || Haleakala || Pan-STARRS ||  || align=right data-sort-value="0.61" | 610 m || 
|-id=454 bgcolor=#fefefe
| 505454 ||  || — || September 1, 2013 || Mount Lemmon || Mount Lemmon Survey ||  || align=right data-sort-value="0.79" | 790 m || 
|-id=455 bgcolor=#E9E9E9
| 505455 ||  || — || September 21, 2009 || Kitt Peak || Spacewatch ||  || align=right data-sort-value="0.99" | 990 m || 
|-id=456 bgcolor=#fefefe
| 505456 ||  || — || August 15, 2009 || Kitt Peak || Spacewatch || MAS || align=right data-sort-value="0.72" | 720 m || 
|-id=457 bgcolor=#fefefe
| 505457 ||  || — || January 30, 2011 || Haleakala || Pan-STARRS ||  || align=right data-sort-value="0.80" | 800 m || 
|-id=458 bgcolor=#fefefe
| 505458 ||  || — || August 16, 2009 || La Sagra || OAM Obs. ||  || align=right data-sort-value="0.68" | 680 m || 
|-id=459 bgcolor=#E9E9E9
| 505459 ||  || — || May 30, 2008 || Kitt Peak || Spacewatch ||  || align=right | 1.2 km || 
|-id=460 bgcolor=#E9E9E9
| 505460 ||  || — || October 6, 2013 || Mount Lemmon || Mount Lemmon Survey ||  || align=right | 1.6 km || 
|-id=461 bgcolor=#FA8072
| 505461 ||  || — || April 26, 2007 || Kitt Peak || Spacewatch ||  || align=right data-sort-value="0.74" | 740 m || 
|-id=462 bgcolor=#E9E9E9
| 505462 ||  || — || September 23, 2009 || Kitt Peak || Spacewatch ||  || align=right data-sort-value="0.61" | 610 m || 
|-id=463 bgcolor=#FA8072
| 505463 ||  || — || August 28, 2009 || Kitt Peak || Spacewatch ||  || align=right data-sort-value="0.60" | 600 m || 
|-id=464 bgcolor=#E9E9E9
| 505464 ||  || — || September 13, 2013 || Mount Lemmon || Mount Lemmon Survey ||  || align=right | 2.5 km || 
|-id=465 bgcolor=#E9E9E9
| 505465 ||  || — || October 1, 2013 || Mount Lemmon || Mount Lemmon Survey ||  || align=right data-sort-value="0.87" | 870 m || 
|-id=466 bgcolor=#E9E9E9
| 505466 ||  || — || December 20, 2009 || Mount Lemmon || Mount Lemmon Survey ||  || align=right | 1.4 km || 
|-id=467 bgcolor=#E9E9E9
| 505467 ||  || — || March 25, 2007 || Mount Lemmon || Mount Lemmon Survey || HNS || align=right data-sort-value="0.82" | 820 m || 
|-id=468 bgcolor=#E9E9E9
| 505468 ||  || — || October 12, 2005 || Kitt Peak || Spacewatch ||  || align=right data-sort-value="0.65" | 650 m || 
|-id=469 bgcolor=#E9E9E9
| 505469 ||  || — || September 21, 2009 || Mount Lemmon || Mount Lemmon Survey ||  || align=right data-sort-value="0.82" | 820 m || 
|-id=470 bgcolor=#fefefe
| 505470 ||  || — || August 28, 2005 || Kitt Peak || Spacewatch || NYS || align=right data-sort-value="0.51" | 510 m || 
|-id=471 bgcolor=#E9E9E9
| 505471 ||  || — || April 12, 2002 || Kitt Peak || Spacewatch ||  || align=right | 1.3 km || 
|-id=472 bgcolor=#E9E9E9
| 505472 ||  || — || September 16, 2013 || Mount Lemmon || Mount Lemmon Survey || EUN || align=right data-sort-value="0.97" | 970 m || 
|-id=473 bgcolor=#fefefe
| 505473 ||  || — || February 23, 2011 || Haleakala || Pan-STARRS ||  || align=right data-sort-value="0.80" | 800 m || 
|-id=474 bgcolor=#E9E9E9
| 505474 ||  || — || May 15, 2008 || Mount Lemmon || Mount Lemmon Survey ||  || align=right | 1.8 km || 
|-id=475 bgcolor=#E9E9E9
| 505475 ||  || — || September 28, 2009 || Mount Lemmon || Mount Lemmon Survey ||  || align=right data-sort-value="0.67" | 670 m || 
|-id=476 bgcolor=#C2E0FF
| 505476 ||  || — || August 2, 2013 || Mauna Kea || OSSOS || cubewano (cold)mooncritical || align=right | 197 km || 
|-id=477 bgcolor=#C2E0FF
| 505477 ||  || — || August 2, 2013 || Mauna Kea || OSSOS || res6:11 || align=right | 185 km || 
|-id=478 bgcolor=#C2E0FF
| 505478 ||  || — || August 2, 2013 || Mauna Kea || OSSOS || SDOcritical || align=right | 255 km || 
|-id=479 bgcolor=#E9E9E9
| 505479 ||  || — || October 6, 2005 || Kitt Peak || Spacewatch ||  || align=right data-sort-value="0.79" | 790 m || 
|-id=480 bgcolor=#E9E9E9
| 505480 ||  || — || December 17, 2001 || Kitt Peak || Spacewatch ||  || align=right | 1.8 km || 
|-id=481 bgcolor=#E9E9E9
| 505481 ||  || — || November 25, 2009 || Mount Lemmon || Mount Lemmon Survey || EUN || align=right data-sort-value="0.94" | 940 m || 
|-id=482 bgcolor=#E9E9E9
| 505482 ||  || — || April 29, 2011 || Catalina || CSS ||  || align=right | 1.2 km || 
|-id=483 bgcolor=#fefefe
| 505483 ||  || — || September 16, 2009 || Catalina || CSS ||  || align=right data-sort-value="0.88" | 880 m || 
|-id=484 bgcolor=#E9E9E9
| 505484 ||  || — || November 25, 2009 || Mount Lemmon || Mount Lemmon Survey ||  || align=right data-sort-value="0.99" | 990 m || 
|-id=485 bgcolor=#E9E9E9
| 505485 ||  || — || May 22, 2011 || Mount Lemmon || Mount Lemmon Survey || HNS || align=right | 1.3 km || 
|-id=486 bgcolor=#E9E9E9
| 505486 ||  || — || November 4, 2013 || XuYi || PMO NEO ||  || align=right data-sort-value="0.87" | 870 m || 
|-id=487 bgcolor=#E9E9E9
| 505487 ||  || — || November 16, 2009 || Kitt Peak || Spacewatch ||  || align=right data-sort-value="0.79" | 790 m || 
|-id=488 bgcolor=#E9E9E9
| 505488 ||  || — || May 21, 2012 || Haleakala || Pan-STARRS ||  || align=right data-sort-value="0.90" | 900 m || 
|-id=489 bgcolor=#E9E9E9
| 505489 ||  || — || April 3, 2011 || Haleakala || Pan-STARRS ||  || align=right | 1.7 km || 
|-id=490 bgcolor=#E9E9E9
| 505490 ||  || — || January 11, 2010 || Mount Lemmon || Mount Lemmon Survey ||  || align=right | 1.2 km || 
|-id=491 bgcolor=#E9E9E9
| 505491 ||  || — || October 18, 2009 || Mount Lemmon || Mount Lemmon Survey || EUN || align=right | 1.0 km || 
|-id=492 bgcolor=#E9E9E9
| 505492 ||  || — || September 25, 2008 || Mount Lemmon || Mount Lemmon Survey ||  || align=right | 1.7 km || 
|-id=493 bgcolor=#E9E9E9
| 505493 ||  || — || July 13, 2013 || Haleakala || Pan-STARRS ||  || align=right | 1.0 km || 
|-id=494 bgcolor=#E9E9E9
| 505494 ||  || — || November 10, 2013 || Kitt Peak || Spacewatch ||  || align=right | 1.1 km || 
|-id=495 bgcolor=#E9E9E9
| 505495 ||  || — || December 30, 2000 || Socorro || LINEAR ||  || align=right | 2.0 km || 
|-id=496 bgcolor=#E9E9E9
| 505496 ||  || — || July 16, 2013 || Haleakala || Pan-STARRS ||  || align=right | 1.0 km || 
|-id=497 bgcolor=#E9E9E9
| 505497 ||  || — || April 21, 2011 || Haleakala || Pan-STARRS ||  || align=right | 3.3 km || 
|-id=498 bgcolor=#d6d6d6
| 505498 ||  || — || November 27, 2013 || Haleakala || Pan-STARRS ||  || align=right | 3.0 km || 
|-id=499 bgcolor=#E9E9E9
| 505499 ||  || — || November 10, 2005 || Mount Lemmon || Mount Lemmon Survey ||  || align=right data-sort-value="0.82" | 820 m || 
|-id=500 bgcolor=#E9E9E9
| 505500 ||  || — || October 30, 2013 || Haleakala || Pan-STARRS ||  || align=right | 1.5 km || 
|}

505501–505600 

|-bgcolor=#E9E9E9
| 505501 ||  || — || October 8, 2004 || Kitt Peak || Spacewatch ||  || align=right | 1.2 km || 
|-id=502 bgcolor=#E9E9E9
| 505502 ||  || — || October 26, 2013 || Mount Lemmon || Mount Lemmon Survey ||  || align=right | 1.8 km || 
|-id=503 bgcolor=#E9E9E9
| 505503 ||  || — || April 21, 2012 || Kitt Peak || Spacewatch ||  || align=right | 1.5 km || 
|-id=504 bgcolor=#E9E9E9
| 505504 ||  || — || April 28, 2011 || Haleakala || Pan-STARRS || HNS || align=right | 1.2 km || 
|-id=505 bgcolor=#E9E9E9
| 505505 ||  || — || December 2, 2005 || Mount Lemmon || Mount Lemmon Survey || EUN || align=right data-sort-value="0.96" | 960 m || 
|-id=506 bgcolor=#E9E9E9
| 505506 ||  || — || August 14, 2004 || Campo Imperatore || CINEOS || RAF || align=right data-sort-value="0.79" | 790 m || 
|-id=507 bgcolor=#E9E9E9
| 505507 ||  || — || September 10, 2004 || Kitt Peak || Spacewatch ||  || align=right | 1.2 km || 
|-id=508 bgcolor=#E9E9E9
| 505508 ||  || — || December 28, 2005 || Kitt Peak || Spacewatch ||  || align=right data-sort-value="0.77" | 770 m || 
|-id=509 bgcolor=#E9E9E9
| 505509 ||  || — || November 26, 2009 || Mount Lemmon || Mount Lemmon Survey ||  || align=right data-sort-value="0.64" | 640 m || 
|-id=510 bgcolor=#E9E9E9
| 505510 ||  || — || November 29, 2013 || Haleakala || Pan-STARRS ||  || align=right | 1.8 km || 
|-id=511 bgcolor=#E9E9E9
| 505511 ||  || — || November 28, 2013 || Mount Lemmon || Mount Lemmon Survey ||  || align=right | 2.7 km || 
|-id=512 bgcolor=#E9E9E9
| 505512 ||  || — || November 22, 2009 || Mount Lemmon || Mount Lemmon Survey ||  || align=right | 1.6 km || 
|-id=513 bgcolor=#E9E9E9
| 505513 ||  || — || May 21, 2012 || Haleakala || Pan-STARRS ||  || align=right | 1.3 km || 
|-id=514 bgcolor=#E9E9E9
| 505514 ||  || — || November 10, 2013 || Mount Lemmon || Mount Lemmon Survey ||  || align=right data-sort-value="0.97" | 970 m || 
|-id=515 bgcolor=#E9E9E9
| 505515 ||  || — || June 6, 2011 || Mount Lemmon || Mount Lemmon Survey ||  || align=right | 2.3 km || 
|-id=516 bgcolor=#E9E9E9
| 505516 ||  || — || February 15, 2010 || Catalina || CSS ||  || align=right | 1.5 km || 
|-id=517 bgcolor=#E9E9E9
| 505517 ||  || — || October 28, 2008 || Kitt Peak || Spacewatch ||  || align=right | 1.9 km || 
|-id=518 bgcolor=#E9E9E9
| 505518 ||  || — || December 24, 2013 || Mount Lemmon || Mount Lemmon Survey ||  || align=right | 1.6 km || 
|-id=519 bgcolor=#d6d6d6
| 505519 ||  || — || October 23, 2012 || Haleakala || Pan-STARRS ||  || align=right | 2.5 km || 
|-id=520 bgcolor=#E9E9E9
| 505520 ||  || — || April 30, 2011 || Kitt Peak || Spacewatch || HNS || align=right | 1.0 km || 
|-id=521 bgcolor=#E9E9E9
| 505521 ||  || — || January 17, 2005 || Kitt Peak || Spacewatch || MRX || align=right | 1.0 km || 
|-id=522 bgcolor=#E9E9E9
| 505522 ||  || — || December 27, 2009 || Kitt Peak || Spacewatch || EUN || align=right data-sort-value="0.97" | 970 m || 
|-id=523 bgcolor=#E9E9E9
| 505523 ||  || — || November 11, 2013 || Kitt Peak || Spacewatch ||  || align=right | 1.5 km || 
|-id=524 bgcolor=#E9E9E9
| 505524 ||  || — || December 28, 2005 || Mount Lemmon || Mount Lemmon Survey ||  || align=right data-sort-value="0.78" | 780 m || 
|-id=525 bgcolor=#E9E9E9
| 505525 ||  || — || November 29, 2000 || Socorro || LINEAR ||  || align=right | 1.7 km || 
|-id=526 bgcolor=#E9E9E9
| 505526 ||  || — || November 30, 2008 || Kitt Peak || Spacewatch ||  || align=right | 1.7 km || 
|-id=527 bgcolor=#E9E9E9
| 505527 ||  || — || April 8, 2010 || Kitt Peak || Spacewatch ||  || align=right | 1.2 km || 
|-id=528 bgcolor=#d6d6d6
| 505528 ||  || — || December 25, 2013 || Mount Lemmon || Mount Lemmon Survey ||  || align=right | 3.4 km || 
|-id=529 bgcolor=#E9E9E9
| 505529 ||  || — || December 24, 2013 || Mount Lemmon || Mount Lemmon Survey ||  || align=right | 1.8 km || 
|-id=530 bgcolor=#E9E9E9
| 505530 ||  || — || May 29, 2012 || Mount Lemmon || Mount Lemmon Survey ||  || align=right data-sort-value="0.96" | 960 m || 
|-id=531 bgcolor=#E9E9E9
| 505531 ||  || — || January 4, 2006 || Catalina || CSS ||  || align=right | 1.3 km || 
|-id=532 bgcolor=#E9E9E9
| 505532 ||  || — || October 31, 2008 || Catalina || CSS ||  || align=right | 1.7 km || 
|-id=533 bgcolor=#E9E9E9
| 505533 ||  || — || December 26, 2013 || Kitt Peak || Spacewatch ||  || align=right | 2.3 km || 
|-id=534 bgcolor=#E9E9E9
| 505534 ||  || — || November 18, 2003 || Kitt Peak || Spacewatch ||  || align=right | 1.9 km || 
|-id=535 bgcolor=#E9E9E9
| 505535 ||  || — || November 28, 2013 || Mount Lemmon || Mount Lemmon Survey ||  || align=right | 1.6 km || 
|-id=536 bgcolor=#E9E9E9
| 505536 ||  || — || April 7, 2006 || Kitt Peak || Spacewatch ||  || align=right | 1.3 km || 
|-id=537 bgcolor=#E9E9E9
| 505537 ||  || — || December 15, 2009 || Mount Lemmon || Mount Lemmon Survey ||  || align=right | 1.5 km || 
|-id=538 bgcolor=#E9E9E9
| 505538 ||  || — || December 9, 1996 || Kitt Peak || Spacewatch ||  || align=right | 1.4 km || 
|-id=539 bgcolor=#d6d6d6
| 505539 ||  || — || December 21, 2008 || Kitt Peak || Spacewatch ||  || align=right | 2.2 km || 
|-id=540 bgcolor=#E9E9E9
| 505540 ||  || — || June 22, 2010 || WISE || WISE ||  || align=right | 2.3 km || 
|-id=541 bgcolor=#d6d6d6
| 505541 ||  || — || November 8, 2007 || Kitt Peak || Spacewatch ||  || align=right | 2.7 km || 
|-id=542 bgcolor=#E9E9E9
| 505542 ||  || — || February 17, 2010 || Kitt Peak || Spacewatch ||  || align=right | 1.4 km || 
|-id=543 bgcolor=#d6d6d6
| 505543 ||  || — || December 17, 2007 || Mount Lemmon || Mount Lemmon Survey ||  || align=right | 2.9 km || 
|-id=544 bgcolor=#E9E9E9
| 505544 ||  || — || January 6, 2000 || Kitt Peak || Spacewatch || DOR || align=right | 2.9 km || 
|-id=545 bgcolor=#d6d6d6
| 505545 ||  || — || December 30, 2013 || Mount Lemmon || Mount Lemmon Survey || VER || align=right | 2.8 km || 
|-id=546 bgcolor=#E9E9E9
| 505546 ||  || — || November 7, 2008 || Mount Lemmon || Mount Lemmon Survey ||  || align=right | 1.9 km || 
|-id=547 bgcolor=#d6d6d6
| 505547 ||  || — || April 7, 2010 || WISE || WISE || EUP || align=right | 2.9 km || 
|-id=548 bgcolor=#E9E9E9
| 505548 ||  || — || December 31, 2013 || Mount Lemmon || Mount Lemmon Survey ||  || align=right | 2.3 km || 
|-id=549 bgcolor=#E9E9E9
| 505549 ||  || — || October 4, 2008 || La Sagra || OAM Obs. ||  || align=right | 2.0 km || 
|-id=550 bgcolor=#d6d6d6
| 505550 ||  || — || July 28, 2011 || Haleakala || Pan-STARRS ||  || align=right | 2.9 km || 
|-id=551 bgcolor=#E9E9E9
| 505551 ||  || — || December 29, 2005 || Kitt Peak || Spacewatch ||  || align=right | 1.0 km || 
|-id=552 bgcolor=#d6d6d6
| 505552 ||  || — || October 11, 2012 || Mount Lemmon || Mount Lemmon Survey ||  || align=right | 1.8 km || 
|-id=553 bgcolor=#E9E9E9
| 505553 ||  || — || December 25, 2013 || Mount Lemmon || Mount Lemmon Survey ||  || align=right | 1.7 km || 
|-id=554 bgcolor=#E9E9E9
| 505554 ||  || — || January 23, 2006 || Kitt Peak || Spacewatch ||  || align=right data-sort-value="0.85" | 850 m || 
|-id=555 bgcolor=#E9E9E9
| 505555 ||  || — || January 19, 2005 || Kitt Peak || Spacewatch ||  || align=right | 2.2 km || 
|-id=556 bgcolor=#E9E9E9
| 505556 ||  || — || December 16, 2004 || Kitt Peak || Spacewatch || NEM || align=right | 2.2 km || 
|-id=557 bgcolor=#E9E9E9
| 505557 ||  || — || October 7, 2013 || Mount Lemmon || Mount Lemmon Survey ||  || align=right | 1.6 km || 
|-id=558 bgcolor=#E9E9E9
| 505558 ||  || — || September 30, 2003 || Kitt Peak || Spacewatch ||  || align=right | 1.7 km || 
|-id=559 bgcolor=#d6d6d6
| 505559 ||  || — || December 24, 2013 || Mount Lemmon || Mount Lemmon Survey ||  || align=right | 2.7 km || 
|-id=560 bgcolor=#E9E9E9
| 505560 ||  || — || February 25, 2006 || Kitt Peak || Spacewatch || MIS || align=right | 2.0 km || 
|-id=561 bgcolor=#E9E9E9
| 505561 ||  || — || September 23, 2008 || Mount Lemmon || Mount Lemmon Survey ||  || align=right | 1.5 km || 
|-id=562 bgcolor=#E9E9E9
| 505562 ||  || — || February 2, 2005 || Catalina || CSS ||  || align=right | 2.7 km || 
|-id=563 bgcolor=#E9E9E9
| 505563 ||  || — || January 7, 2010 || Kitt Peak || Spacewatch ||  || align=right | 1.0 km || 
|-id=564 bgcolor=#E9E9E9
| 505564 ||  || — || December 26, 2013 || Mount Lemmon || Mount Lemmon Survey ||  || align=right | 1.0 km || 
|-id=565 bgcolor=#E9E9E9
| 505565 ||  || — || April 1, 2005 || Catalina || CSS ||  || align=right | 2.0 km || 
|-id=566 bgcolor=#E9E9E9
| 505566 ||  || — || February 20, 2006 || Kitt Peak || Spacewatch || HNS || align=right | 1.0 km || 
|-id=567 bgcolor=#E9E9E9
| 505567 ||  || — || November 24, 2009 || Mount Lemmon || Mount Lemmon Survey ||  || align=right | 2.0 km || 
|-id=568 bgcolor=#E9E9E9
| 505568 ||  || — || September 14, 2013 || Haleakala || Pan-STARRS ||  || align=right | 2.7 km || 
|-id=569 bgcolor=#d6d6d6
| 505569 ||  || — || December 18, 2007 || Mount Lemmon || Mount Lemmon Survey || VER || align=right | 2.6 km || 
|-id=570 bgcolor=#E9E9E9
| 505570 ||  || — || May 12, 2010 || WISE || WISE ||  || align=right | 3.6 km || 
|-id=571 bgcolor=#E9E9E9
| 505571 ||  || — || September 19, 2003 || Kitt Peak || Spacewatch ||  || align=right | 2.2 km || 
|-id=572 bgcolor=#E9E9E9
| 505572 ||  || — || October 7, 2012 || Haleakala || Pan-STARRS ||  || align=right | 2.3 km || 
|-id=573 bgcolor=#E9E9E9
| 505573 ||  || — || January 1, 2014 || Haleakala || Pan-STARRS ||  || align=right | 1.2 km || 
|-id=574 bgcolor=#d6d6d6
| 505574 ||  || — || July 28, 2011 || Haleakala || Pan-STARRS ||  || align=right | 2.9 km || 
|-id=575 bgcolor=#E9E9E9
| 505575 ||  || — || February 16, 2010 || WISE || WISE ||  || align=right | 3.2 km || 
|-id=576 bgcolor=#E9E9E9
| 505576 ||  || — || March 3, 2005 || Catalina || CSS ||  || align=right | 2.0 km || 
|-id=577 bgcolor=#d6d6d6
| 505577 ||  || — || January 23, 2014 || Mount Lemmon || Mount Lemmon Survey ||  || align=right | 2.9 km || 
|-id=578 bgcolor=#d6d6d6
| 505578 ||  || — || February 28, 2009 || Mount Lemmon || Mount Lemmon Survey || BRA || align=right | 1.2 km || 
|-id=579 bgcolor=#E9E9E9
| 505579 ||  || — || August 14, 2012 || Kitt Peak || Spacewatch ||  || align=right | 2.4 km || 
|-id=580 bgcolor=#d6d6d6
| 505580 ||  || — || August 6, 2011 || Haleakala || Pan-STARRS ||  || align=right | 2.9 km || 
|-id=581 bgcolor=#E9E9E9
| 505581 ||  || — || February 16, 2010 || WISE || WISE ||  || align=right | 2.4 km || 
|-id=582 bgcolor=#d6d6d6
| 505582 ||  || — || December 18, 2007 || Mount Lemmon || Mount Lemmon Survey || EOS || align=right | 2.1 km || 
|-id=583 bgcolor=#E9E9E9
| 505583 ||  || — || January 16, 2010 || Mount Lemmon || Mount Lemmon Survey ||  || align=right data-sort-value="0.84" | 840 m || 
|-id=584 bgcolor=#E9E9E9
| 505584 ||  || — || February 6, 2000 || Kitt Peak || Spacewatch ||  || align=right | 2.0 km || 
|-id=585 bgcolor=#E9E9E9
| 505585 ||  || — || November 1, 2013 || Mount Lemmon || Mount Lemmon Survey ||  || align=right | 3.1 km || 
|-id=586 bgcolor=#d6d6d6
| 505586 ||  || — || March 22, 2009 || Mount Lemmon || Mount Lemmon Survey ||  || align=right | 2.6 km || 
|-id=587 bgcolor=#d6d6d6
| 505587 ||  || — || December 13, 2013 || Mount Lemmon || Mount Lemmon Survey ||  || align=right | 3.6 km || 
|-id=588 bgcolor=#d6d6d6
| 505588 ||  || — || December 30, 2013 || Mount Lemmon || Mount Lemmon Survey ||  || align=right | 3.1 km || 
|-id=589 bgcolor=#d6d6d6
| 505589 ||  || — || April 20, 2010 || WISE || WISE ||  || align=right | 3.0 km || 
|-id=590 bgcolor=#FA8072
| 505590 ||  || — || March 5, 2010 || Catalina || CSS ||  || align=right data-sort-value="0.78" | 780 m || 
|-id=591 bgcolor=#E9E9E9
| 505591 ||  || — || October 21, 2003 || Kitt Peak || Spacewatch ||  || align=right | 1.6 km || 
|-id=592 bgcolor=#d6d6d6
| 505592 ||  || — || January 29, 2009 || Mount Lemmon || Mount Lemmon Survey ||  || align=right | 2.3 km || 
|-id=593 bgcolor=#d6d6d6
| 505593 ||  || — || January 3, 2014 || Mount Lemmon || Mount Lemmon Survey ||  || align=right | 2.9 km || 
|-id=594 bgcolor=#E9E9E9
| 505594 ||  || — || November 21, 2008 || Kitt Peak || Spacewatch ||  || align=right | 2.1 km || 
|-id=595 bgcolor=#E9E9E9
| 505595 ||  || — || December 19, 2009 || Mount Lemmon || Mount Lemmon Survey ||  || align=right | 1.1 km || 
|-id=596 bgcolor=#E9E9E9
| 505596 ||  || — || October 1, 2003 || Kitt Peak || Spacewatch ||  || align=right | 2.4 km || 
|-id=597 bgcolor=#d6d6d6
| 505597 ||  || — || February 12, 2004 || Kitt Peak || Spacewatch ||  || align=right | 1.9 km || 
|-id=598 bgcolor=#d6d6d6
| 505598 ||  || — || November 3, 2007 || Kitt Peak || Spacewatch ||  || align=right | 2.2 km || 
|-id=599 bgcolor=#d6d6d6
| 505599 ||  || — || September 4, 2011 || Haleakala || Pan-STARRS ||  || align=right | 3.2 km || 
|-id=600 bgcolor=#d6d6d6
| 505600 ||  || — || September 23, 2011 || Haleakala || Pan-STARRS ||  || align=right | 2.8 km || 
|}

505601–505700 

|-bgcolor=#d6d6d6
| 505601 ||  || — || February 10, 2014 || Haleakala || Pan-STARRS ||  || align=right | 2.4 km || 
|-id=602 bgcolor=#d6d6d6
| 505602 ||  || — || October 21, 2006 || Kitt Peak || Spacewatch ||  || align=right | 2.3 km || 
|-id=603 bgcolor=#d6d6d6
| 505603 ||  || — || January 29, 2014 || Mount Lemmon || Mount Lemmon Survey ||  || align=right | 3.0 km || 
|-id=604 bgcolor=#d6d6d6
| 505604 ||  || — || December 16, 2007 || Mount Lemmon || Mount Lemmon Survey ||  || align=right | 2.3 km || 
|-id=605 bgcolor=#d6d6d6
| 505605 ||  || — || December 30, 2007 || Mount Lemmon || Mount Lemmon Survey ||  || align=right | 2.3 km || 
|-id=606 bgcolor=#d6d6d6
| 505606 ||  || — || November 19, 2007 || Mount Lemmon || Mount Lemmon Survey ||  || align=right | 2.0 km || 
|-id=607 bgcolor=#d6d6d6
| 505607 ||  || — || October 30, 2007 || Kitt Peak || Spacewatch ||  || align=right | 1.9 km || 
|-id=608 bgcolor=#d6d6d6
| 505608 ||  || — || April 19, 2007 || Mount Lemmon || Mount Lemmon Survey || 3:2 || align=right | 4.2 km || 
|-id=609 bgcolor=#fefefe
| 505609 ||  || — || October 8, 2012 || Haleakala || Pan-STARRS || H || align=right data-sort-value="0.64" | 640 m || 
|-id=610 bgcolor=#d6d6d6
| 505610 ||  || — || February 28, 2014 || Haleakala || Pan-STARRS ||  || align=right | 3.0 km || 
|-id=611 bgcolor=#d6d6d6
| 505611 ||  || — || February 27, 2014 || Mount Lemmon || Mount Lemmon Survey ||  || align=right | 2.7 km || 
|-id=612 bgcolor=#d6d6d6
| 505612 ||  || — || August 29, 2006 || Kitt Peak || Spacewatch ||  || align=right | 3.3 km || 
|-id=613 bgcolor=#d6d6d6
| 505613 ||  || — || August 31, 2011 || Haleakala || Pan-STARRS ||  || align=right | 3.1 km || 
|-id=614 bgcolor=#d6d6d6
| 505614 ||  || — || April 2, 2009 || Kitt Peak || Spacewatch || EOS || align=right | 1.6 km || 
|-id=615 bgcolor=#d6d6d6
| 505615 ||  || — || February 26, 2014 || Mount Lemmon || Mount Lemmon Survey ||  || align=right | 2.8 km || 
|-id=616 bgcolor=#d6d6d6
| 505616 ||  || — || February 26, 2014 || Mount Lemmon || Mount Lemmon Survey ||  || align=right | 3.1 km || 
|-id=617 bgcolor=#d6d6d6
| 505617 ||  || — || September 26, 2011 || Haleakala || Pan-STARRS ||  || align=right | 3.0 km || 
|-id=618 bgcolor=#d6d6d6
| 505618 ||  || — || September 19, 2006 || Kitt Peak || Spacewatch ||  || align=right | 2.3 km || 
|-id=619 bgcolor=#d6d6d6
| 505619 ||  || — || January 3, 2014 || Mount Lemmon || Mount Lemmon Survey ||  || align=right | 3.1 km || 
|-id=620 bgcolor=#fefefe
| 505620 ||  || — || September 21, 2012 || Mount Lemmon || Mount Lemmon Survey || H || align=right data-sort-value="0.62" | 620 m || 
|-id=621 bgcolor=#d6d6d6
| 505621 ||  || — || December 22, 2012 || Haleakala || Pan-STARRS ||  || align=right | 3.3 km || 
|-id=622 bgcolor=#d6d6d6
| 505622 ||  || — || February 28, 2008 || Kitt Peak || Spacewatch || 7:4 || align=right | 2.9 km || 
|-id=623 bgcolor=#d6d6d6
| 505623 ||  || — || September 26, 2011 || Haleakala || Pan-STARRS ||  || align=right | 2.9 km || 
|-id=624 bgcolor=#C2E0FF
| 505624 ||  || — || April 8, 2014 || Haleakala || Pan-STARRS || other TNOcritical || align=right | 293 km || 
|-id=625 bgcolor=#d6d6d6
| 505625 ||  || — || May 26, 2009 || Mount Lemmon || Mount Lemmon Survey || EUP || align=right | 3.1 km || 
|-id=626 bgcolor=#d6d6d6
| 505626 ||  || — || November 1, 2006 || Kitt Peak || Spacewatch ||  || align=right | 2.6 km || 
|-id=627 bgcolor=#d6d6d6
| 505627 ||  || — || January 20, 2008 || Mount Lemmon || Mount Lemmon Survey ||  || align=right | 2.4 km || 
|-id=628 bgcolor=#d6d6d6
| 505628 ||  || — || March 27, 2003 || Kitt Peak || Spacewatch ||  || align=right | 2.4 km || 
|-id=629 bgcolor=#d6d6d6
| 505629 ||  || — || November 14, 2006 || Mount Lemmon || Mount Lemmon Survey ||  || align=right | 2.4 km || 
|-id=630 bgcolor=#d6d6d6
| 505630 ||  || — || April 21, 2014 || Kitt Peak || Spacewatch || 3:2 || align=right | 4.1 km || 
|-id=631 bgcolor=#d6d6d6
| 505631 ||  || — || February 8, 2008 || Catalina || CSS ||  || align=right | 2.7 km || 
|-id=632 bgcolor=#d6d6d6
| 505632 ||  || — || October 25, 2011 || Haleakala || Pan-STARRS || 7:4 || align=right | 4.6 km || 
|-id=633 bgcolor=#fefefe
| 505633 ||  || — || October 10, 2012 || Catalina || CSS || H || align=right data-sort-value="0.49" | 490 m || 
|-id=634 bgcolor=#fefefe
| 505634 ||  || — || October 8, 2012 || Haleakala || Pan-STARRS || H || align=right data-sort-value="0.67" | 670 m || 
|-id=635 bgcolor=#fefefe
| 505635 ||  || — || November 6, 2012 || Mount Lemmon || Mount Lemmon Survey || H || align=right data-sort-value="0.47" | 470 m || 
|-id=636 bgcolor=#fefefe
| 505636 ||  || — || August 16, 2009 || Catalina || CSS || H || align=right data-sort-value="0.75" | 750 m || 
|-id=637 bgcolor=#FA8072
| 505637 ||  || — || October 4, 2012 || Haleakala || Pan-STARRS || H || align=right data-sort-value="0.54" | 540 m || 
|-id=638 bgcolor=#fefefe
| 505638 ||  || — || January 22, 2013 || Kitt Peak || Spacewatch || H || align=right data-sort-value="0.48" | 480 m || 
|-id=639 bgcolor=#fefefe
| 505639 ||  || — || February 3, 2005 || Socorro || LINEAR || H || align=right data-sort-value="0.68" | 680 m || 
|-id=640 bgcolor=#fefefe
| 505640 ||  || — || December 23, 2012 || Mount Lemmon || Mount Lemmon Survey || H || align=right data-sort-value="0.70" | 700 m || 
|-id=641 bgcolor=#fefefe
| 505641 ||  || — || June 27, 2014 || Haleakala || Pan-STARRS || H || align=right data-sort-value="0.38" | 380 m || 
|-id=642 bgcolor=#fefefe
| 505642 ||  || — || July 8, 2014 || Haleakala || Pan-STARRS || H || align=right data-sort-value="0.52" | 520 m || 
|-id=643 bgcolor=#fefefe
| 505643 ||  || — || January 9, 2013 || Catalina || CSS || H || align=right data-sort-value="0.78" | 780 m || 
|-id=644 bgcolor=#d6d6d6
| 505644 ||  || — || February 24, 2006 || Mount Lemmon || Mount Lemmon Survey || 7:4 || align=right | 2.9 km || 
|-id=645 bgcolor=#fefefe
| 505645 ||  || — || July 27, 2014 || Haleakala || Pan-STARRS || H || align=right data-sort-value="0.64" | 640 m || 
|-id=646 bgcolor=#fefefe
| 505646 ||  || — || June 26, 2014 || Haleakala || Pan-STARRS || H || align=right data-sort-value="0.53" | 530 m || 
|-id=647 bgcolor=#fefefe
| 505647 ||  || — || August 25, 2014 || Haleakala || Pan-STARRS || H || align=right data-sort-value="0.66" | 660 m || 
|-id=648 bgcolor=#fefefe
| 505648 ||  || — || March 7, 2013 || Mount Lemmon || Mount Lemmon Survey || H || align=right data-sort-value="0.56" | 560 m || 
|-id=649 bgcolor=#fefefe
| 505649 ||  || — || August 29, 2014 || Haleakala || Pan-STARRS || H || align=right data-sort-value="0.54" | 540 m || 
|-id=650 bgcolor=#fefefe
| 505650 ||  || — || February 17, 2013 || Catalina || CSS || H || align=right data-sort-value="0.60" | 600 m || 
|-id=651 bgcolor=#fefefe
| 505651 ||  || — || August 28, 2014 || Haleakala || Pan-STARRS || H || align=right data-sort-value="0.60" | 600 m || 
|-id=652 bgcolor=#fefefe
| 505652 ||  || — || February 16, 2013 || Mount Lemmon || Mount Lemmon Survey ||  || align=right data-sort-value="0.62" | 620 m || 
|-id=653 bgcolor=#fefefe
| 505653 ||  || — || March 3, 2013 || Kitt Peak || Spacewatch || H || align=right data-sort-value="0.83" | 830 m || 
|-id=654 bgcolor=#fefefe
| 505654 ||  || — || February 14, 2013 || Haleakala || Pan-STARRS || H || align=right data-sort-value="0.68" | 680 m || 
|-id=655 bgcolor=#FA8072
| 505655 ||  || — || September 24, 2014 || Mount Lemmon || Mount Lemmon Survey ||  || align=right data-sort-value="0.54" | 540 m || 
|-id=656 bgcolor=#fefefe
| 505656 ||  || — || September 2, 2014 || Haleakala || Pan-STARRS ||  || align=right data-sort-value="0.59" | 590 m || 
|-id=657 bgcolor=#FFC2E0
| 505657 ||  || — || September 30, 2014 || WISE || WISE || APOPHAcritical || align=right data-sort-value="0.97" | 970 m || 
|-id=658 bgcolor=#fefefe
| 505658 ||  || — || September 19, 2014 || Haleakala || Pan-STARRS ||  || align=right data-sort-value="0.54" | 540 m || 
|-id=659 bgcolor=#fefefe
| 505659 ||  || — || December 29, 2008 || Mount Lemmon || Mount Lemmon Survey ||  || align=right data-sort-value="0.59" | 590 m || 
|-id=660 bgcolor=#fefefe
| 505660 ||  || — || March 20, 2013 || Haleakala || Pan-STARRS ||  || align=right data-sort-value="0.60" | 600 m || 
|-id=661 bgcolor=#fefefe
| 505661 ||  || — || October 1, 2014 || Haleakala || Pan-STARRS || H || align=right data-sort-value="0.47" | 470 m || 
|-id=662 bgcolor=#d6d6d6
| 505662 ||  || — || August 24, 2008 || Kitt Peak || Spacewatch ||  || align=right | 3.3 km || 
|-id=663 bgcolor=#E9E9E9
| 505663 ||  || — || January 8, 2010 || WISE || WISE ||  || align=right | 2.4 km || 
|-id=664 bgcolor=#E9E9E9
| 505664 ||  || — || September 12, 2001 || Socorro || LINEAR ||  || align=right | 1.6 km || 
|-id=665 bgcolor=#fefefe
| 505665 ||  || — || October 8, 2004 || Kitt Peak || Spacewatch ||  || align=right data-sort-value="0.56" | 560 m || 
|-id=666 bgcolor=#fefefe
| 505666 ||  || — || September 11, 2004 || Kitt Peak || Spacewatch ||  || align=right data-sort-value="0.48" | 480 m || 
|-id=667 bgcolor=#FFC2E0
| 505667 ||  || — || August 6, 2014 || Haleakala || Pan-STARRS || AMO +1km || align=right data-sort-value="0.82" | 820 m || 
|-id=668 bgcolor=#E9E9E9
| 505668 ||  || — || April 6, 2008 || Kitt Peak || Spacewatch ||  || align=right | 1.2 km || 
|-id=669 bgcolor=#fefefe
| 505669 ||  || — || April 7, 2013 || Mount Lemmon || Mount Lemmon Survey ||  || align=right data-sort-value="0.57" | 570 m || 
|-id=670 bgcolor=#fefefe
| 505670 ||  || — || February 1, 2009 || Mount Lemmon || Mount Lemmon Survey ||  || align=right data-sort-value="0.76" | 760 m || 
|-id=671 bgcolor=#fefefe
| 505671 ||  || — || May 27, 2003 || Kitt Peak || Spacewatch || H || align=right data-sort-value="0.70" | 700 m || 
|-id=672 bgcolor=#fefefe
| 505672 ||  || — || May 4, 2006 || Kitt Peak || Spacewatch ||  || align=right data-sort-value="0.71" | 710 m || 
|-id=673 bgcolor=#fefefe
| 505673 ||  || — || December 30, 2005 || Kitt Peak || Spacewatch ||  || align=right data-sort-value="0.67" | 670 m || 
|-id=674 bgcolor=#fefefe
| 505674 ||  || — || September 20, 2001 || Socorro || LINEAR ||  || align=right data-sort-value="0.87" | 870 m || 
|-id=675 bgcolor=#fefefe
| 505675 ||  || — || April 8, 2013 || Mount Lemmon || Mount Lemmon Survey ||  || align=right data-sort-value="0.59" | 590 m || 
|-id=676 bgcolor=#fefefe
| 505676 ||  || — || August 31, 2014 || Haleakala || Pan-STARRS ||  || align=right data-sort-value="0.67" | 670 m || 
|-id=677 bgcolor=#E9E9E9
| 505677 ||  || — || November 18, 2006 || Mount Lemmon || Mount Lemmon Survey ||  || align=right | 1.5 km || 
|-id=678 bgcolor=#E9E9E9
| 505678 ||  || — || June 29, 2005 || Kitt Peak || Spacewatch ||  || align=right | 1.9 km || 
|-id=679 bgcolor=#C2E0FF
| 505679 ||  || — || October 8, 2010 || Haleakala || Pan-STARRS || twotino? || align=right | 290 km || 
|-id=680 bgcolor=#fefefe
| 505680 ||  || — || January 13, 2005 || Catalina || CSS ||  || align=right data-sort-value="0.88" | 880 m || 
|-id=681 bgcolor=#fefefe
| 505681 ||  || — || November 4, 2014 || Mount Lemmon || Mount Lemmon Survey ||  || align=right data-sort-value="0.72" | 720 m || 
|-id=682 bgcolor=#fefefe
| 505682 ||  || — || January 20, 2012 || Mount Lemmon || Mount Lemmon Survey || NYS || align=right data-sort-value="0.66" | 660 m || 
|-id=683 bgcolor=#fefefe
| 505683 ||  || — || January 2, 2009 || Mount Lemmon || Mount Lemmon Survey ||  || align=right data-sort-value="0.58" | 580 m || 
|-id=684 bgcolor=#fefefe
| 505684 ||  || — || January 2, 2012 || Kitt Peak || Spacewatch ||  || align=right data-sort-value="0.48" | 480 m || 
|-id=685 bgcolor=#fefefe
| 505685 ||  || — || December 17, 2004 || Socorro || LINEAR ||  || align=right data-sort-value="0.78" | 780 m || 
|-id=686 bgcolor=#fefefe
| 505686 ||  || — || March 16, 2009 || Kitt Peak || Spacewatch ||  || align=right data-sort-value="0.51" | 510 m || 
|-id=687 bgcolor=#fefefe
| 505687 ||  || — || November 26, 2014 || Haleakala || Pan-STARRS ||  || align=right data-sort-value="0.75" | 750 m || 
|-id=688 bgcolor=#E9E9E9
| 505688 ||  || — || November 4, 2005 || Mount Lemmon || Mount Lemmon Survey ||  || align=right | 1.3 km || 
|-id=689 bgcolor=#E9E9E9
| 505689 ||  || — || April 15, 2007 || Mount Lemmon || Mount Lemmon Survey ||  || align=right | 1.9 km || 
|-id=690 bgcolor=#E9E9E9
| 505690 ||  || — || November 21, 2005 || Anderson Mesa || LONEOS ||  || align=right | 1.9 km || 
|-id=691 bgcolor=#fefefe
| 505691 ||  || — || October 22, 2003 || Kitt Peak || Spacewatch ||  || align=right data-sort-value="0.66" | 660 m || 
|-id=692 bgcolor=#fefefe
| 505692 ||  || — || January 26, 2012 || Haleakala || Pan-STARRS ||  || align=right data-sort-value="0.47" | 470 m || 
|-id=693 bgcolor=#fefefe
| 505693 ||  || — || January 25, 2012 || Haleakala || Pan-STARRS ||  || align=right data-sort-value="0.61" | 610 m || 
|-id=694 bgcolor=#fefefe
| 505694 ||  || — || February 9, 2005 || Kitt Peak || Spacewatch ||  || align=right | 1.0 km || 
|-id=695 bgcolor=#E9E9E9
| 505695 ||  || — || June 18, 2005 || Mount Lemmon || Mount Lemmon Survey ||  || align=right | 1.3 km || 
|-id=696 bgcolor=#fefefe
| 505696 ||  || — || December 4, 2007 || Mount Lemmon || Mount Lemmon Survey ||  || align=right data-sort-value="0.73" | 730 m || 
|-id=697 bgcolor=#d6d6d6
| 505697 ||  || — || October 24, 2008 || Catalina || CSS ||  || align=right | 4.8 km || 
|-id=698 bgcolor=#fefefe
| 505698 ||  || — || March 23, 2006 || Kitt Peak || Spacewatch ||  || align=right data-sort-value="0.82" | 820 m || 
|-id=699 bgcolor=#fefefe
| 505699 ||  || — || December 14, 2004 || Socorro || LINEAR ||  || align=right data-sort-value="0.75" | 750 m || 
|-id=700 bgcolor=#E9E9E9
| 505700 ||  || — || November 21, 2014 || Haleakala || Pan-STARRS ||  || align=right | 2.7 km || 
|}

505701–505800 

|-bgcolor=#fefefe
| 505701 ||  || — || September 14, 1998 || Kitt Peak || Spacewatch ||  || align=right | 1.1 km || 
|-id=702 bgcolor=#fefefe
| 505702 ||  || — || March 3, 2000 || Socorro || LINEAR ||  || align=right | 1.1 km || 
|-id=703 bgcolor=#fefefe
| 505703 ||  || — || October 8, 2007 || Kitt Peak || Spacewatch ||  || align=right data-sort-value="0.47" | 470 m || 
|-id=704 bgcolor=#d6d6d6
| 505704 ||  || — || May 19, 2012 || Mount Lemmon || Mount Lemmon Survey ||  || align=right | 2.7 km || 
|-id=705 bgcolor=#E9E9E9
| 505705 ||  || — || January 30, 2011 || Haleakala || Pan-STARRS ||  || align=right | 1.3 km || 
|-id=706 bgcolor=#fefefe
| 505706 ||  || — || October 2, 2010 || Mount Lemmon || Mount Lemmon Survey ||  || align=right data-sort-value="0.69" | 690 m || 
|-id=707 bgcolor=#fefefe
| 505707 ||  || — || September 16, 2003 || Kitt Peak || Spacewatch ||  || align=right data-sort-value="0.59" | 590 m || 
|-id=708 bgcolor=#fefefe
| 505708 ||  || — || January 13, 2008 || Kitt Peak || Spacewatch ||  || align=right data-sort-value="0.73" | 730 m || 
|-id=709 bgcolor=#E9E9E9
| 505709 ||  || — || December 8, 2010 || Mount Lemmon || Mount Lemmon Survey ||  || align=right | 1.3 km || 
|-id=710 bgcolor=#fefefe
| 505710 ||  || — || February 7, 2008 || Mount Lemmon || Mount Lemmon Survey ||  || align=right data-sort-value="0.67" | 670 m || 
|-id=711 bgcolor=#fefefe
| 505711 ||  || — || April 1, 2005 || Kitt Peak || Spacewatch ||  || align=right data-sort-value="0.66" | 660 m || 
|-id=712 bgcolor=#fefefe
| 505712 ||  || — || December 6, 2011 || Haleakala || Pan-STARRS ||  || align=right data-sort-value="0.78" | 780 m || 
|-id=713 bgcolor=#fefefe
| 505713 ||  || — || November 8, 2007 || Socorro || LINEAR ||  || align=right data-sort-value="0.71" | 710 m || 
|-id=714 bgcolor=#fefefe
| 505714 ||  || — || November 7, 2007 || Kitt Peak || Spacewatch ||  || align=right data-sort-value="0.54" | 540 m || 
|-id=715 bgcolor=#fefefe
| 505715 ||  || — || September 3, 2013 || Kitt Peak || Spacewatch ||  || align=right data-sort-value="0.98" | 980 m || 
|-id=716 bgcolor=#fefefe
| 505716 ||  || — || February 28, 2012 || Haleakala || Pan-STARRS ||  || align=right data-sort-value="0.43" | 430 m || 
|-id=717 bgcolor=#fefefe
| 505717 ||  || — || February 22, 2004 || Kitt Peak || Spacewatch || MAS || align=right data-sort-value="0.63" | 630 m || 
|-id=718 bgcolor=#fefefe
| 505718 ||  || — || February 13, 2008 || Kitt Peak || Spacewatch ||  || align=right | 1.0 km || 
|-id=719 bgcolor=#fefefe
| 505719 ||  || — || December 4, 2007 || Catalina || CSS ||  || align=right data-sort-value="0.66" | 660 m || 
|-id=720 bgcolor=#d6d6d6
| 505720 ||  || — || August 10, 2012 || Kitt Peak || Spacewatch ||  || align=right | 2.6 km || 
|-id=721 bgcolor=#E9E9E9
| 505721 ||  || — || June 24, 2007 || Kitt Peak || Spacewatch ||  || align=right | 2.4 km || 
|-id=722 bgcolor=#E9E9E9
| 505722 ||  || — || November 30, 2005 || Kitt Peak || Spacewatch ||  || align=right | 1.5 km || 
|-id=723 bgcolor=#E9E9E9
| 505723 ||  || — || October 26, 2013 || Kitt Peak || Spacewatch ||  || align=right | 1.6 km || 
|-id=724 bgcolor=#E9E9E9
| 505724 ||  || — || September 14, 2013 || Haleakala || Pan-STARRS || EUN || align=right data-sort-value="0.84" | 840 m || 
|-id=725 bgcolor=#fefefe
| 505725 ||  || — || July 13, 2013 || Haleakala || Pan-STARRS ||  || align=right data-sort-value="0.62" | 620 m || 
|-id=726 bgcolor=#E9E9E9
| 505726 ||  || — || December 26, 2006 || Kitt Peak || Spacewatch ||  || align=right data-sort-value="0.74" | 740 m || 
|-id=727 bgcolor=#fefefe
| 505727 ||  || — || September 11, 2007 || Kitt Peak || Spacewatch ||  || align=right data-sort-value="0.59" | 590 m || 
|-id=728 bgcolor=#FA8072
| 505728 ||  || — || October 10, 2007 || Catalina || CSS ||  || align=right data-sort-value="0.75" | 750 m || 
|-id=729 bgcolor=#fefefe
| 505729 ||  || — || November 28, 2010 || Mount Lemmon || Mount Lemmon Survey ||  || align=right data-sort-value="0.61" | 610 m || 
|-id=730 bgcolor=#fefefe
| 505730 ||  || — || August 15, 2009 || Catalina || CSS ||  || align=right | 1.0 km || 
|-id=731 bgcolor=#E9E9E9
| 505731 ||  || — || June 14, 2012 || Mount Lemmon || Mount Lemmon Survey ||  || align=right | 1.3 km || 
|-id=732 bgcolor=#fefefe
| 505732 ||  || — || April 15, 2008 || Mount Lemmon || Mount Lemmon Survey ||  || align=right data-sort-value="0.87" | 870 m || 
|-id=733 bgcolor=#fefefe
| 505733 ||  || — || April 27, 2012 || Kitt Peak || Spacewatch ||  || align=right data-sort-value="0.71" | 710 m || 
|-id=734 bgcolor=#fefefe
| 505734 ||  || — || March 8, 2008 || Kitt Peak || Spacewatch ||  || align=right data-sort-value="0.85" | 850 m || 
|-id=735 bgcolor=#fefefe
| 505735 ||  || — || October 28, 2010 || Mount Lemmon || Mount Lemmon Survey ||  || align=right data-sort-value="0.89" | 890 m || 
|-id=736 bgcolor=#fefefe
| 505736 ||  || — || October 21, 2006 || Mount Lemmon || Mount Lemmon Survey ||  || align=right data-sort-value="0.80" | 800 m || 
|-id=737 bgcolor=#E9E9E9
| 505737 ||  || — || June 15, 2012 || Haleakala || Pan-STARRS ||  || align=right | 2.0 km || 
|-id=738 bgcolor=#E9E9E9
| 505738 ||  || — || October 29, 2005 || Kitt Peak || Spacewatch ||  || align=right data-sort-value="0.87" | 870 m || 
|-id=739 bgcolor=#d6d6d6
| 505739 ||  || — || December 3, 2004 || Kitt Peak || Spacewatch ||  || align=right | 2.9 km || 
|-id=740 bgcolor=#E9E9E9
| 505740 ||  || — || July 29, 2008 || Kitt Peak || Spacewatch ||  || align=right | 2.6 km || 
|-id=741 bgcolor=#E9E9E9
| 505741 ||  || — || January 11, 2011 || Mount Lemmon || Mount Lemmon Survey ||  || align=right | 1.6 km || 
|-id=742 bgcolor=#fefefe
| 505742 ||  || — || January 23, 2011 || Mount Lemmon || Mount Lemmon Survey ||  || align=right data-sort-value="0.80" | 800 m || 
|-id=743 bgcolor=#fefefe
| 505743 ||  || — || March 15, 2004 || Kitt Peak || Spacewatch ||  || align=right data-sort-value="0.67" | 670 m || 
|-id=744 bgcolor=#fefefe
| 505744 ||  || — || February 17, 2004 || Kitt Peak || Spacewatch ||  || align=right data-sort-value="0.90" | 900 m || 
|-id=745 bgcolor=#fefefe
| 505745 ||  || — || November 5, 2010 || Kitt Peak || Spacewatch ||  || align=right data-sort-value="0.99" | 990 m || 
|-id=746 bgcolor=#fefefe
| 505746 ||  || — || April 27, 2012 || Haleakala || Pan-STARRS ||  || align=right data-sort-value="0.68" | 680 m || 
|-id=747 bgcolor=#d6d6d6
| 505747 ||  || — || February 4, 2005 || Kitt Peak || Spacewatch ||  || align=right | 2.3 km || 
|-id=748 bgcolor=#fefefe
| 505748 ||  || — || November 16, 2006 || Kitt Peak || Spacewatch ||  || align=right data-sort-value="0.68" | 680 m || 
|-id=749 bgcolor=#E9E9E9
| 505749 ||  || — || April 2, 2011 || Haleakala || Pan-STARRS ||  || align=right | 1.4 km || 
|-id=750 bgcolor=#E9E9E9
| 505750 ||  || — || March 31, 2011 || Haleakala || Pan-STARRS ||  || align=right | 1.8 km || 
|-id=751 bgcolor=#fefefe
| 505751 ||  || — || January 27, 2004 || Kitt Peak || Spacewatch ||  || align=right data-sort-value="0.80" | 800 m || 
|-id=752 bgcolor=#fefefe
| 505752 ||  || — || January 11, 2008 || Kitt Peak || Spacewatch ||  || align=right data-sort-value="0.68" | 680 m || 
|-id=753 bgcolor=#fefefe
| 505753 ||  || — || January 12, 2011 || Kitt Peak || Spacewatch ||  || align=right data-sort-value="0.64" | 640 m || 
|-id=754 bgcolor=#E9E9E9
| 505754 ||  || — || November 28, 2006 || Mount Lemmon || Mount Lemmon Survey || MAR || align=right | 1.1 km || 
|-id=755 bgcolor=#fefefe
| 505755 ||  || — || October 2, 2006 || Mount Lemmon || Mount Lemmon Survey ||  || align=right data-sort-value="0.87" | 870 m || 
|-id=756 bgcolor=#E9E9E9
| 505756 ||  || — || January 30, 2011 || Haleakala || Pan-STARRS ||  || align=right data-sort-value="0.96" | 960 m || 
|-id=757 bgcolor=#fefefe
| 505757 ||  || — || August 28, 2009 || La Sagra || OAM Obs. ||  || align=right data-sort-value="0.83" | 830 m || 
|-id=758 bgcolor=#E9E9E9
| 505758 ||  || — || December 30, 2005 || Kitt Peak || Spacewatch ||  || align=right | 1.5 km || 
|-id=759 bgcolor=#fefefe
| 505759 ||  || — || February 2, 2008 || Kitt Peak || Spacewatch ||  || align=right data-sort-value="0.95" | 950 m || 
|-id=760 bgcolor=#E9E9E9
| 505760 ||  || — || April 22, 1998 || Kitt Peak || Spacewatch ||  || align=right | 1.6 km || 
|-id=761 bgcolor=#fefefe
| 505761 ||  || — || September 1, 2013 || Catalina || CSS || V || align=right data-sort-value="0.62" | 620 m || 
|-id=762 bgcolor=#E9E9E9
| 505762 ||  || — || January 30, 2011 || Kitt Peak || Spacewatch ||  || align=right | 1.3 km || 
|-id=763 bgcolor=#fefefe
| 505763 ||  || — || November 16, 2006 || Kitt Peak || Spacewatch ||  || align=right data-sort-value="0.88" | 880 m || 
|-id=764 bgcolor=#fefefe
| 505764 ||  || — || November 30, 2003 || Kitt Peak || Spacewatch ||  || align=right data-sort-value="0.63" | 630 m || 
|-id=765 bgcolor=#E9E9E9
| 505765 ||  || — || June 16, 2012 || Haleakala || Pan-STARRS ||  || align=right | 2.0 km || 
|-id=766 bgcolor=#fefefe
| 505766 ||  || — || January 17, 2005 || Kitt Peak || Spacewatch ||  || align=right data-sort-value="0.70" | 700 m || 
|-id=767 bgcolor=#E9E9E9
| 505767 ||  || — || July 29, 2008 || Mount Lemmon || Mount Lemmon Survey ||  || align=right | 2.2 km || 
|-id=768 bgcolor=#fefefe
| 505768 ||  || — || April 3, 2008 || Kitt Peak || Spacewatch || NYS || align=right data-sort-value="0.77" | 770 m || 
|-id=769 bgcolor=#fefefe
| 505769 ||  || — || December 15, 2007 || Kitt Peak || Spacewatch ||  || align=right data-sort-value="0.64" | 640 m || 
|-id=770 bgcolor=#E9E9E9
| 505770 ||  || — || March 5, 2006 || Kitt Peak || Spacewatch ||  || align=right | 2.6 km || 
|-id=771 bgcolor=#fefefe
| 505771 ||  || — || October 19, 2007 || Catalina || CSS ||  || align=right data-sort-value="0.52" | 520 m || 
|-id=772 bgcolor=#E9E9E9
| 505772 ||  || — || June 16, 2012 || Haleakala || Pan-STARRS ||  || align=right | 1.6 km || 
|-id=773 bgcolor=#d6d6d6
| 505773 ||  || — || November 14, 2013 || Mount Lemmon || Mount Lemmon Survey ||  || align=right | 3.3 km || 
|-id=774 bgcolor=#E9E9E9
| 505774 ||  || — || January 18, 2015 || Haleakala || Pan-STARRS ||  || align=right | 1.1 km || 
|-id=775 bgcolor=#fefefe
| 505775 ||  || — || December 10, 2010 || Kitt Peak || Spacewatch ||  || align=right data-sort-value="0.81" | 810 m || 
|-id=776 bgcolor=#fefefe
| 505776 ||  || — || March 2, 2008 || Kitt Peak || Spacewatch ||  || align=right data-sort-value="0.62" | 620 m || 
|-id=777 bgcolor=#d6d6d6
| 505777 ||  || — || March 8, 2010 || WISE || WISE ||  || align=right | 4.0 km || 
|-id=778 bgcolor=#fefefe
| 505778 ||  || — || February 1, 2008 || Kitt Peak || Spacewatch || V || align=right data-sort-value="0.73" | 730 m || 
|-id=779 bgcolor=#fefefe
| 505779 ||  || — || November 22, 2006 || Kitt Peak || Spacewatch ||  || align=right data-sort-value="0.72" | 720 m || 
|-id=780 bgcolor=#d6d6d6
| 505780 ||  || — || December 29, 2014 || Mount Lemmon || Mount Lemmon Survey ||  || align=right | 2.9 km || 
|-id=781 bgcolor=#E9E9E9
| 505781 ||  || — || February 23, 2011 || Catalina || CSS ||  || align=right data-sort-value="0.80" | 800 m || 
|-id=782 bgcolor=#E9E9E9
| 505782 ||  || — || January 30, 2011 || Haleakala || Pan-STARRS || RAF || align=right data-sort-value="0.97" | 970 m || 
|-id=783 bgcolor=#E9E9E9
| 505783 ||  || — || June 10, 2012 || Haleakala || Pan-STARRS ||  || align=right | 2.2 km || 
|-id=784 bgcolor=#fefefe
| 505784 ||  || — || January 19, 2015 || Kitt Peak || Spacewatch ||  || align=right data-sort-value="0.69" | 690 m || 
|-id=785 bgcolor=#E9E9E9
| 505785 ||  || — || April 21, 2011 || Haleakala || Pan-STARRS || EUN || align=right | 1.0 km || 
|-id=786 bgcolor=#E9E9E9
| 505786 ||  || — || September 2, 2013 || Mount Lemmon || Mount Lemmon Survey ||  || align=right data-sort-value="0.88" | 880 m || 
|-id=787 bgcolor=#E9E9E9
| 505787 ||  || — || November 11, 2004 || Kitt Peak || Spacewatch || EUN || align=right | 1.4 km || 
|-id=788 bgcolor=#E9E9E9
| 505788 ||  || — || January 30, 2011 || Kitt Peak || Spacewatch ||  || align=right | 1.3 km || 
|-id=789 bgcolor=#E9E9E9
| 505789 ||  || — || March 6, 2011 || Kitt Peak || Spacewatch ||  || align=right data-sort-value="0.89" | 890 m || 
|-id=790 bgcolor=#fefefe
| 505790 ||  || — || October 16, 2006 || Catalina || CSS ||  || align=right data-sort-value="0.77" | 770 m || 
|-id=791 bgcolor=#E9E9E9
| 505791 ||  || — || April 14, 2007 || Kitt Peak || Spacewatch ||  || align=right data-sort-value="0.93" | 930 m || 
|-id=792 bgcolor=#d6d6d6
| 505792 ||  || — || November 18, 2003 || Kitt Peak || Spacewatch ||  || align=right | 2.5 km || 
|-id=793 bgcolor=#E9E9E9
| 505793 ||  || — || April 5, 2003 || Kitt Peak || Spacewatch ||  || align=right data-sort-value="0.85" | 850 m || 
|-id=794 bgcolor=#E9E9E9
| 505794 ||  || — || November 23, 2009 || Mount Lemmon || Mount Lemmon Survey || (5) || align=right data-sort-value="0.82" | 820 m || 
|-id=795 bgcolor=#fefefe
| 505795 ||  || — || December 6, 2010 || Mount Lemmon || Mount Lemmon Survey ||  || align=right data-sort-value="0.70" | 700 m || 
|-id=796 bgcolor=#fefefe
| 505796 ||  || — || September 4, 2010 || Mount Lemmon || Mount Lemmon Survey ||  || align=right data-sort-value="0.86" | 860 m || 
|-id=797 bgcolor=#E9E9E9
| 505797 ||  || — || February 13, 2011 || Mount Lemmon || Mount Lemmon Survey ||  || align=right | 1.2 km || 
|-id=798 bgcolor=#fefefe
| 505798 ||  || — || January 15, 2004 || Kitt Peak || Spacewatch || V || align=right data-sort-value="0.60" | 600 m || 
|-id=799 bgcolor=#fefefe
| 505799 ||  || — || January 10, 2011 || Kitt Peak || Spacewatch ||  || align=right data-sort-value="0.67" | 670 m || 
|-id=800 bgcolor=#E9E9E9
| 505800 ||  || — || December 21, 2014 || Mount Lemmon || Mount Lemmon Survey ||  || align=right | 1.7 km || 
|}

505801–505900 

|-bgcolor=#fefefe
| 505801 ||  || — || October 24, 2007 || Mount Lemmon || Mount Lemmon Survey ||  || align=right data-sort-value="0.62" | 620 m || 
|-id=802 bgcolor=#fefefe
| 505802 ||  || — || March 30, 2012 || Mount Lemmon || Mount Lemmon Survey ||  || align=right data-sort-value="0.83" | 830 m || 
|-id=803 bgcolor=#fefefe
| 505803 ||  || — || January 20, 2008 || Kitt Peak || Spacewatch ||  || align=right data-sort-value="0.76" | 760 m || 
|-id=804 bgcolor=#fefefe
| 505804 ||  || — || November 19, 2003 || Kitt Peak || Spacewatch ||  || align=right data-sort-value="0.88" | 880 m || 
|-id=805 bgcolor=#E9E9E9
| 505805 ||  || — || December 24, 2005 || Kitt Peak || Spacewatch ||  || align=right | 1.4 km || 
|-id=806 bgcolor=#fefefe
| 505806 ||  || — || April 24, 2012 || Haleakala || Pan-STARRS ||  || align=right data-sort-value="0.90" | 900 m || 
|-id=807 bgcolor=#fefefe
| 505807 ||  || — || November 10, 2006 || Kitt Peak || Spacewatch ||  || align=right data-sort-value="0.76" | 760 m || 
|-id=808 bgcolor=#E9E9E9
| 505808 ||  || — || March 6, 2011 || Mount Lemmon || Mount Lemmon Survey ||  || align=right | 1.1 km || 
|-id=809 bgcolor=#E9E9E9
| 505809 ||  || — || December 2, 2005 || Kitt Peak || Spacewatch ||  || align=right | 1.1 km || 
|-id=810 bgcolor=#E9E9E9
| 505810 ||  || — || March 26, 2007 || Kitt Peak || Spacewatch ||  || align=right | 1.4 km || 
|-id=811 bgcolor=#E9E9E9
| 505811 ||  || — || September 2, 2000 || Socorro || LINEAR ||  || align=right | 1.3 km || 
|-id=812 bgcolor=#d6d6d6
| 505812 ||  || — || June 8, 2010 || WISE || WISE ||  || align=right | 3.5 km || 
|-id=813 bgcolor=#E9E9E9
| 505813 ||  || — || November 26, 2005 || Mount Lemmon || Mount Lemmon Survey ||  || align=right data-sort-value="0.74" | 740 m || 
|-id=814 bgcolor=#E9E9E9
| 505814 ||  || — || November 30, 2005 || Kitt Peak || Spacewatch ||  || align=right | 1.5 km || 
|-id=815 bgcolor=#E9E9E9
| 505815 ||  || — || October 6, 2013 || Catalina || CSS ||  || align=right | 1.2 km || 
|-id=816 bgcolor=#E9E9E9
| 505816 ||  || — || September 6, 2013 || Kitt Peak || Spacewatch || ADE || align=right | 1.3 km || 
|-id=817 bgcolor=#fefefe
| 505817 ||  || — || January 9, 2011 || Mount Lemmon || Mount Lemmon Survey ||  || align=right data-sort-value="0.52" | 520 m || 
|-id=818 bgcolor=#E9E9E9
| 505818 ||  || — || September 2, 2008 || Kitt Peak || Spacewatch ||  || align=right | 1.4 km || 
|-id=819 bgcolor=#E9E9E9
| 505819 ||  || — || February 13, 2011 || Mount Lemmon || Mount Lemmon Survey ||  || align=right data-sort-value="0.72" | 720 m || 
|-id=820 bgcolor=#E9E9E9
| 505820 ||  || — || March 5, 2002 || Kitt Peak || Spacewatch ||  || align=right | 1.7 km || 
|-id=821 bgcolor=#fefefe
| 505821 ||  || — || September 27, 2009 || Mount Lemmon || Mount Lemmon Survey ||  || align=right data-sort-value="0.75" | 750 m || 
|-id=822 bgcolor=#fefefe
| 505822 ||  || — || February 9, 2005 || Mount Lemmon || Mount Lemmon Survey ||  || align=right data-sort-value="0.72" | 720 m || 
|-id=823 bgcolor=#d6d6d6
| 505823 ||  || — || February 17, 2010 || Mount Lemmon || Mount Lemmon Survey ||  || align=right | 2.7 km || 
|-id=824 bgcolor=#d6d6d6
| 505824 ||  || — || January 25, 2009 || Kitt Peak || Spacewatch ||  || align=right | 2.8 km || 
|-id=825 bgcolor=#E9E9E9
| 505825 ||  || — || January 20, 2015 || Haleakala || Pan-STARRS ||  || align=right | 1.1 km || 
|-id=826 bgcolor=#E9E9E9
| 505826 ||  || — || February 23, 2007 || Mount Lemmon || Mount Lemmon Survey || MAR || align=right | 1.0 km || 
|-id=827 bgcolor=#E9E9E9
| 505827 ||  || — || November 30, 2005 || Mount Lemmon || Mount Lemmon Survey ||  || align=right | 2.2 km || 
|-id=828 bgcolor=#fefefe
| 505828 ||  || — || July 2, 2013 || Haleakala || Pan-STARRS ||  || align=right data-sort-value="0.74" | 740 m || 
|-id=829 bgcolor=#E9E9E9
| 505829 ||  || — || July 30, 2008 || Mount Lemmon || Mount Lemmon Survey ||  || align=right | 2.0 km || 
|-id=830 bgcolor=#E9E9E9
| 505830 ||  || — || August 24, 2000 || Socorro || LINEAR ||  || align=right | 1.3 km || 
|-id=831 bgcolor=#FA8072
| 505831 ||  || — || January 6, 2015 || Haleakala || Pan-STARRS ||  || align=right data-sort-value="0.77" | 770 m || 
|-id=832 bgcolor=#fefefe
| 505832 ||  || — || February 28, 2008 || Kitt Peak || Spacewatch ||  || align=right data-sort-value="0.82" | 820 m || 
|-id=833 bgcolor=#E9E9E9
| 505833 ||  || — || February 25, 2007 || Mount Lemmon || Mount Lemmon Survey ||  || align=right | 1.1 km || 
|-id=834 bgcolor=#fefefe
| 505834 ||  || — || January 18, 2008 || Mount Lemmon || Mount Lemmon Survey ||  || align=right data-sort-value="0.73" | 730 m || 
|-id=835 bgcolor=#fefefe
| 505835 ||  || — || February 14, 2008 || Mount Lemmon || Mount Lemmon Survey ||  || align=right data-sort-value="0.76" | 760 m || 
|-id=836 bgcolor=#E9E9E9
| 505836 ||  || — || October 29, 2005 || Catalina || CSS ||  || align=right | 1.0 km || 
|-id=837 bgcolor=#E9E9E9
| 505837 ||  || — || October 1, 2003 || Kitt Peak || Spacewatch ||  || align=right | 2.5 km || 
|-id=838 bgcolor=#fefefe
| 505838 ||  || — || December 9, 2010 || Kitt Peak || Spacewatch ||  || align=right data-sort-value="0.75" | 750 m || 
|-id=839 bgcolor=#fefefe
| 505839 ||  || — || September 13, 2009 || La Sagra || OAM Obs. ||  || align=right | 1.1 km || 
|-id=840 bgcolor=#fefefe
| 505840 ||  || — || January 13, 2011 || Mount Lemmon || Mount Lemmon Survey ||  || align=right data-sort-value="0.65" | 650 m || 
|-id=841 bgcolor=#E9E9E9
| 505841 ||  || — || April 6, 1994 || Kitt Peak || Spacewatch ||  || align=right | 1.3 km || 
|-id=842 bgcolor=#fefefe
| 505842 ||  || — || October 3, 2006 || Mount Lemmon || Mount Lemmon Survey ||  || align=right data-sort-value="0.79" | 790 m || 
|-id=843 bgcolor=#E9E9E9
| 505843 ||  || — || March 13, 2007 || Mount Lemmon || Mount Lemmon Survey ||  || align=right data-sort-value="0.97" | 970 m || 
|-id=844 bgcolor=#E9E9E9
| 505844 ||  || — || April 6, 2011 || Mount Lemmon || Mount Lemmon Survey ||  || align=right | 1.4 km || 
|-id=845 bgcolor=#fefefe
| 505845 ||  || — || September 25, 2009 || Kitt Peak || Spacewatch ||  || align=right data-sort-value="0.91" | 910 m || 
|-id=846 bgcolor=#d6d6d6
| 505846 ||  || — || January 8, 2010 || Kitt Peak || Spacewatch ||  || align=right | 2.8 km || 
|-id=847 bgcolor=#E9E9E9
| 505847 ||  || — || February 25, 2006 || Mount Lemmon || Mount Lemmon Survey ||  || align=right | 2.0 km || 
|-id=848 bgcolor=#d6d6d6
| 505848 ||  || — || February 4, 2009 || Catalina || CSS ||  || align=right | 2.9 km || 
|-id=849 bgcolor=#fefefe
| 505849 ||  || — || February 17, 2004 || Kitt Peak || Spacewatch ||  || align=right data-sort-value="0.85" | 850 m || 
|-id=850 bgcolor=#fefefe
| 505850 ||  || — || September 27, 2006 || Kitt Peak || Spacewatch ||  || align=right data-sort-value="0.66" | 660 m || 
|-id=851 bgcolor=#E9E9E9
| 505851 ||  || — || September 3, 2007 || Catalina || CSS ||  || align=right | 2.6 km || 
|-id=852 bgcolor=#E9E9E9
| 505852 ||  || — || August 24, 2012 || Kitt Peak || Spacewatch ||  || align=right | 2.3 km || 
|-id=853 bgcolor=#d6d6d6
| 505853 ||  || — || March 4, 2005 || Mount Lemmon || Mount Lemmon Survey ||  || align=right | 2.8 km || 
|-id=854 bgcolor=#d6d6d6
| 505854 ||  || — || March 12, 2005 || Kitt Peak || Spacewatch ||  || align=right | 2.2 km || 
|-id=855 bgcolor=#E9E9E9
| 505855 ||  || — || December 15, 2009 || Mount Lemmon || Mount Lemmon Survey ||  || align=right | 1.9 km || 
|-id=856 bgcolor=#E9E9E9
| 505856 ||  || — || February 7, 2006 || Catalina || CSS ||  || align=right | 2.0 km || 
|-id=857 bgcolor=#fefefe
| 505857 ||  || — || August 28, 2006 || Kitt Peak || Spacewatch ||  || align=right data-sort-value="0.70" | 700 m || 
|-id=858 bgcolor=#E9E9E9
| 505858 ||  || — || June 21, 2012 || Kitt Peak || Spacewatch ||  || align=right | 1.4 km || 
|-id=859 bgcolor=#E9E9E9
| 505859 ||  || — || March 10, 2011 || Kitt Peak || Spacewatch ||  || align=right | 1.4 km || 
|-id=860 bgcolor=#E9E9E9
| 505860 ||  || — || February 25, 2006 || Kitt Peak || Spacewatch ||  || align=right | 1.8 km || 
|-id=861 bgcolor=#E9E9E9
| 505861 ||  || — || November 1, 2013 || Mount Lemmon || Mount Lemmon Survey ||  || align=right | 1.6 km || 
|-id=862 bgcolor=#E9E9E9
| 505862 ||  || — || April 2, 2011 || Haleakala || Pan-STARRS ||  || align=right data-sort-value="0.92" | 920 m || 
|-id=863 bgcolor=#E9E9E9
| 505863 ||  || — || May 22, 2003 || Kitt Peak || Spacewatch ||  || align=right | 1.6 km || 
|-id=864 bgcolor=#E9E9E9
| 505864 ||  || — || November 20, 2009 || Kitt Peak || Spacewatch ||  || align=right data-sort-value="0.84" | 840 m || 
|-id=865 bgcolor=#E9E9E9
| 505865 ||  || — || February 25, 2007 || Kitt Peak || Spacewatch ||  || align=right data-sort-value="0.94" | 940 m || 
|-id=866 bgcolor=#E9E9E9
| 505866 ||  || — || October 8, 2004 || Kitt Peak || Spacewatch ||  || align=right | 1.3 km || 
|-id=867 bgcolor=#E9E9E9
| 505867 ||  || — || January 8, 2006 || Kitt Peak || Spacewatch ||  || align=right | 1.4 km || 
|-id=868 bgcolor=#d6d6d6
| 505868 ||  || — || January 24, 2015 || Mount Lemmon || Mount Lemmon Survey ||  || align=right | 2.9 km || 
|-id=869 bgcolor=#d6d6d6
| 505869 ||  || — || June 16, 2010 || WISE || WISE ||  || align=right | 4.0 km || 
|-id=870 bgcolor=#E9E9E9
| 505870 ||  || — || March 14, 2007 || Mount Lemmon || Mount Lemmon Survey ||  || align=right data-sort-value="0.87" | 870 m || 
|-id=871 bgcolor=#E9E9E9
| 505871 ||  || — || October 27, 2005 || Kitt Peak || Spacewatch ||  || align=right data-sort-value="0.69" | 690 m || 
|-id=872 bgcolor=#E9E9E9
| 505872 ||  || — || August 12, 2012 || Siding Spring || SSS ||  || align=right | 2.3 km || 
|-id=873 bgcolor=#fefefe
| 505873 ||  || — || March 3, 2008 || XuYi || PMO NEO ||  || align=right | 1.0 km || 
|-id=874 bgcolor=#fefefe
| 505874 ||  || — || January 17, 2008 || Mount Lemmon || Mount Lemmon Survey ||  || align=right data-sort-value="0.62" | 620 m || 
|-id=875 bgcolor=#fefefe
| 505875 ||  || — || May 7, 2005 || Kitt Peak || Spacewatch || V || align=right data-sort-value="0.64" | 640 m || 
|-id=876 bgcolor=#fefefe
| 505876 ||  || — || October 16, 2007 || Mount Lemmon || Mount Lemmon Survey ||  || align=right data-sort-value="0.93" | 930 m || 
|-id=877 bgcolor=#E9E9E9
| 505877 ||  || — || October 25, 2013 || Kitt Peak || Spacewatch ||  || align=right | 1.1 km || 
|-id=878 bgcolor=#E9E9E9
| 505878 ||  || — || October 2, 2008 || Mount Lemmon || Mount Lemmon Survey ||  || align=right | 1.5 km || 
|-id=879 bgcolor=#E9E9E9
| 505879 ||  || — || March 29, 2011 || Mount Lemmon || Mount Lemmon Survey || MAR || align=right data-sort-value="0.92" | 920 m || 
|-id=880 bgcolor=#E9E9E9
| 505880 ||  || — || October 30, 2013 || Kitt Peak || Spacewatch ||  || align=right | 1.8 km || 
|-id=881 bgcolor=#E9E9E9
| 505881 ||  || — || April 13, 2011 || Mount Lemmon || Mount Lemmon Survey ||  || align=right | 1.4 km || 
|-id=882 bgcolor=#E9E9E9
| 505882 ||  || — || February 27, 2006 || Catalina || CSS ||  || align=right | 2.3 km || 
|-id=883 bgcolor=#E9E9E9
| 505883 ||  || — || September 29, 2008 || Catalina || CSS ||  || align=right | 2.3 km || 
|-id=884 bgcolor=#E9E9E9
| 505884 ||  || — || November 9, 2009 || Kitt Peak || Spacewatch || EUN || align=right | 1.1 km || 
|-id=885 bgcolor=#E9E9E9
| 505885 ||  || — || October 8, 2008 || Kitt Peak || Spacewatch ||  || align=right | 2.3 km || 
|-id=886 bgcolor=#fefefe
| 505886 ||  || — || February 13, 2008 || Mount Lemmon || Mount Lemmon Survey ||  || align=right data-sort-value="0.82" | 820 m || 
|-id=887 bgcolor=#fefefe
| 505887 ||  || — || November 17, 2007 || Kitt Peak || Spacewatch ||  || align=right data-sort-value="0.59" | 590 m || 
|-id=888 bgcolor=#fefefe
| 505888 ||  || — || March 12, 2008 || Kitt Peak || Spacewatch ||  || align=right data-sort-value="0.80" | 800 m || 
|-id=889 bgcolor=#E9E9E9
| 505889 ||  || — || October 26, 2009 || Mount Lemmon || Mount Lemmon Survey ||  || align=right | 1.3 km || 
|-id=890 bgcolor=#fefefe
| 505890 ||  || — || March 3, 2005 || Catalina || CSS ||  || align=right data-sort-value="0.67" | 670 m || 
|-id=891 bgcolor=#E9E9E9
| 505891 ||  || — || February 18, 2015 || Haleakala || Pan-STARRS ||  || align=right | 2.4 km || 
|-id=892 bgcolor=#fefefe
| 505892 ||  || — || January 30, 2011 || Haleakala || Pan-STARRS ||  || align=right data-sort-value="0.83" | 830 m || 
|-id=893 bgcolor=#d6d6d6
| 505893 ||  || — || February 18, 2010 || Kitt Peak || Spacewatch ||  || align=right | 2.5 km || 
|-id=894 bgcolor=#E9E9E9
| 505894 ||  || — || September 23, 2000 || Socorro || LINEAR ||  || align=right | 1.8 km || 
|-id=895 bgcolor=#d6d6d6
| 505895 ||  || — || November 3, 2007 || Mount Lemmon || Mount Lemmon Survey ||  || align=right | 3.2 km || 
|-id=896 bgcolor=#d6d6d6
| 505896 ||  || — || January 22, 2015 || Haleakala || Pan-STARRS ||  || align=right | 3.5 km || 
|-id=897 bgcolor=#d6d6d6
| 505897 ||  || — || February 12, 2004 || Kitt Peak || Spacewatch ||  || align=right | 4.1 km || 
|-id=898 bgcolor=#d6d6d6
| 505898 ||  || — || January 28, 2015 || Haleakala || Pan-STARRS ||  || align=right | 2.4 km || 
|-id=899 bgcolor=#d6d6d6
| 505899 ||  || — || July 25, 2011 || Haleakala || Pan-STARRS || 615 || align=right | 1.4 km || 
|-id=900 bgcolor=#d6d6d6
| 505900 ||  || — || September 25, 2011 || Haleakala || Pan-STARRS ||  || align=right | 3.1 km || 
|}

505901–506000 

|-bgcolor=#E9E9E9
| 505901 ||  || — || December 30, 2014 || Mount Lemmon || Mount Lemmon Survey ||  || align=right | 1.2 km || 
|-id=902 bgcolor=#E9E9E9
| 505902 ||  || — || September 29, 2008 || Mount Lemmon || Mount Lemmon Survey || WIT || align=right | 1.0 km || 
|-id=903 bgcolor=#fefefe
| 505903 ||  || — || August 27, 2009 || Kitt Peak || Spacewatch ||  || align=right data-sort-value="0.85" | 850 m || 
|-id=904 bgcolor=#E9E9E9
| 505904 ||  || — || October 26, 2009 || Kitt Peak || Spacewatch ||  || align=right | 1.1 km || 
|-id=905 bgcolor=#E9E9E9
| 505905 ||  || — || October 8, 2008 || Mount Lemmon || Mount Lemmon Survey ||  || align=right | 2.5 km || 
|-id=906 bgcolor=#E9E9E9
| 505906 Raozihe ||  ||  || March 30, 2011 || XuYi || PMO NEO || EUN || align=right | 1.1 km || 
|-id=907 bgcolor=#fefefe
| 505907 ||  || — || November 12, 1999 || Socorro || LINEAR || V || align=right data-sort-value="0.68" | 680 m || 
|-id=908 bgcolor=#fefefe
| 505908 ||  || — || April 1, 2008 || Kitt Peak || Spacewatch ||  || align=right data-sort-value="0.78" | 780 m || 
|-id=909 bgcolor=#d6d6d6
| 505909 ||  || — || January 30, 2010 || WISE || WISE ||  || align=right | 4.2 km || 
|-id=910 bgcolor=#E9E9E9
| 505910 ||  || — || October 12, 2009 || Mount Lemmon || Mount Lemmon Survey ||  || align=right data-sort-value="0.95" | 950 m || 
|-id=911 bgcolor=#fefefe
| 505911 ||  || — || March 27, 2008 || Mount Lemmon || Mount Lemmon Survey ||  || align=right data-sort-value="0.65" | 650 m || 
|-id=912 bgcolor=#E9E9E9
| 505912 ||  || — || September 2, 2008 || Kitt Peak || Spacewatch ||  || align=right | 1.6 km || 
|-id=913 bgcolor=#E9E9E9
| 505913 ||  || — || February 21, 2007 || Mount Lemmon || Mount Lemmon Survey ||  || align=right | 1.0 km || 
|-id=914 bgcolor=#fefefe
| 505914 ||  || — || October 21, 2006 || Catalina || CSS ||  || align=right | 1.1 km || 
|-id=915 bgcolor=#E9E9E9
| 505915 ||  || — || March 2, 2006 || Kitt Peak || Spacewatch ||  || align=right | 2.0 km || 
|-id=916 bgcolor=#d6d6d6
| 505916 ||  || — || February 13, 2004 || Kitt Peak || Spacewatch ||  || align=right | 2.8 km || 
|-id=917 bgcolor=#E9E9E9
| 505917 ||  || — || September 11, 2004 || Kitt Peak || Spacewatch ||  || align=right | 2.7 km || 
|-id=918 bgcolor=#d6d6d6
| 505918 ||  || — || August 24, 2012 || Catalina || CSS ||  || align=right | 2.9 km || 
|-id=919 bgcolor=#E9E9E9
| 505919 ||  || — || January 7, 2010 || Mount Lemmon || Mount Lemmon Survey ||  || align=right | 1.6 km || 
|-id=920 bgcolor=#E9E9E9
| 505920 ||  || — || October 29, 1999 || Kitt Peak || Spacewatch ||  || align=right | 2.8 km || 
|-id=921 bgcolor=#E9E9E9
| 505921 ||  || — || June 10, 2011 || Mount Lemmon || Mount Lemmon Survey ||  || align=right | 3.9 km || 
|-id=922 bgcolor=#E9E9E9
| 505922 ||  || — || November 6, 2013 || Haleakala || Pan-STARRS ||  || align=right data-sort-value="0.98" | 980 m || 
|-id=923 bgcolor=#d6d6d6
| 505923 ||  || — || September 19, 2006 || Catalina || CSS ||  || align=right | 4.0 km || 
|-id=924 bgcolor=#d6d6d6
| 505924 ||  || — || January 20, 2015 || Kitt Peak || Spacewatch ||  || align=right | 3.4 km || 
|-id=925 bgcolor=#E9E9E9
| 505925 ||  || — || January 21, 2015 || Haleakala || Pan-STARRS ||  || align=right | 1.8 km || 
|-id=926 bgcolor=#d6d6d6
| 505926 ||  || — || October 2, 2006 || Mount Lemmon || Mount Lemmon Survey ||  || align=right | 3.6 km || 
|-id=927 bgcolor=#fefefe
| 505927 ||  || — || January 14, 2011 || Kitt Peak || Spacewatch ||  || align=right data-sort-value="0.81" | 810 m || 
|-id=928 bgcolor=#d6d6d6
| 505928 ||  || — || March 14, 2010 || WISE || WISE || Tj (2.99) || align=right | 4.1 km || 
|-id=929 bgcolor=#E9E9E9
| 505929 ||  || — || October 8, 2013 || Mount Lemmon || Mount Lemmon Survey ||  || align=right | 2.1 km || 
|-id=930 bgcolor=#d6d6d6
| 505930 ||  || — || January 23, 2015 || Haleakala || Pan-STARRS ||  || align=right | 3.2 km || 
|-id=931 bgcolor=#d6d6d6
| 505931 ||  || — || May 12, 2010 || Kitt Peak || Spacewatch ||  || align=right | 2.4 km || 
|-id=932 bgcolor=#E9E9E9
| 505932 ||  || — || June 14, 2007 || Kitt Peak || Spacewatch ||  || align=right | 1.9 km || 
|-id=933 bgcolor=#E9E9E9
| 505933 ||  || — || January 17, 2010 || Kitt Peak || Spacewatch ||  || align=right | 1.6 km || 
|-id=934 bgcolor=#E9E9E9
| 505934 ||  || — || October 15, 2004 || Mount Lemmon || Mount Lemmon Survey ||  || align=right | 2.2 km || 
|-id=935 bgcolor=#d6d6d6
| 505935 ||  || — || February 11, 2010 || WISE || WISE ||  || align=right | 2.9 km || 
|-id=936 bgcolor=#fefefe
| 505936 ||  || — || October 2, 2006 || Mount Lemmon || Mount Lemmon Survey ||  || align=right data-sort-value="0.85" | 850 m || 
|-id=937 bgcolor=#E9E9E9
| 505937 ||  || — || September 11, 2004 || Socorro || LINEAR ||  || align=right | 1.6 km || 
|-id=938 bgcolor=#E9E9E9
| 505938 ||  || — || January 24, 2015 || Haleakala || Pan-STARRS ||  || align=right | 2.3 km || 
|-id=939 bgcolor=#E9E9E9
| 505939 ||  || — || December 8, 2005 || Kitt Peak || Spacewatch ||  || align=right | 1.5 km || 
|-id=940 bgcolor=#E9E9E9
| 505940 ||  || — || October 30, 2008 || Mount Lemmon || Mount Lemmon Survey ||  || align=right | 1.9 km || 
|-id=941 bgcolor=#d6d6d6
| 505941 ||  || — || January 14, 2008 || Kitt Peak || Spacewatch ||  || align=right | 3.3 km || 
|-id=942 bgcolor=#E9E9E9
| 505942 ||  || — || March 24, 2006 || Kitt Peak || Spacewatch ||  || align=right | 2.1 km || 
|-id=943 bgcolor=#d6d6d6
| 505943 ||  || — || April 22, 2004 || Kitt Peak || Spacewatch ||  || align=right | 2.6 km || 
|-id=944 bgcolor=#E9E9E9
| 505944 ||  || — || April 5, 2011 || Kitt Peak || Spacewatch ||  || align=right | 1.0 km || 
|-id=945 bgcolor=#d6d6d6
| 505945 ||  || — || December 6, 2012 || Mount Lemmon || Mount Lemmon Survey ||  || align=right | 3.1 km || 
|-id=946 bgcolor=#E9E9E9
| 505946 ||  || — || March 2, 2011 || Mount Lemmon || Mount Lemmon Survey ||  || align=right data-sort-value="0.98" | 980 m || 
|-id=947 bgcolor=#d6d6d6
| 505947 ||  || — || January 30, 2004 || Kitt Peak || Spacewatch ||  || align=right | 2.9 km || 
|-id=948 bgcolor=#fefefe
| 505948 ||  || — || November 17, 2006 || Kitt Peak || Spacewatch || NYS || align=right data-sort-value="0.58" | 580 m || 
|-id=949 bgcolor=#E9E9E9
| 505949 ||  || — || March 21, 2015 || Haleakala || Pan-STARRS ||  || align=right | 1.8 km || 
|-id=950 bgcolor=#E9E9E9
| 505950 ||  || — || August 8, 2012 || Haleakala || Pan-STARRS ||  || align=right | 1.8 km || 
|-id=951 bgcolor=#E9E9E9
| 505951 ||  || — || April 1, 2011 || Kitt Peak || Spacewatch ||  || align=right data-sort-value="0.87" | 870 m || 
|-id=952 bgcolor=#d6d6d6
| 505952 ||  || — || March 1, 2009 || Kitt Peak || Spacewatch ||  || align=right | 2.4 km || 
|-id=953 bgcolor=#d6d6d6
| 505953 ||  || — || February 23, 2010 || WISE || WISE ||  || align=right | 3.9 km || 
|-id=954 bgcolor=#fefefe
| 505954 ||  || — || November 22, 2006 || Mount Lemmon || Mount Lemmon Survey || MAS || align=right data-sort-value="0.98" | 980 m || 
|-id=955 bgcolor=#d6d6d6
| 505955 ||  || — || January 25, 2015 || Haleakala || Pan-STARRS || BRA || align=right | 1.2 km || 
|-id=956 bgcolor=#d6d6d6
| 505956 ||  || — || July 8, 2010 || WISE || WISE || NAE || align=right | 1.9 km || 
|-id=957 bgcolor=#d6d6d6
| 505957 ||  || — || February 16, 2015 || Haleakala || Pan-STARRS || LIX || align=right | 3.2 km || 
|-id=958 bgcolor=#E9E9E9
| 505958 ||  || — || March 1, 2011 || Mount Lemmon || Mount Lemmon Survey || (5) || align=right data-sort-value="0.79" | 790 m || 
|-id=959 bgcolor=#E9E9E9
| 505959 ||  || — || November 26, 2009 || Mount Lemmon || Mount Lemmon Survey ||  || align=right | 1.8 km || 
|-id=960 bgcolor=#E9E9E9
| 505960 ||  || — || April 25, 2006 || Kitt Peak || Spacewatch || AEO || align=right data-sort-value="0.93" | 930 m || 
|-id=961 bgcolor=#E9E9E9
| 505961 ||  || — || October 20, 2012 || Haleakala || Pan-STARRS ||  || align=right | 1.9 km || 
|-id=962 bgcolor=#E9E9E9
| 505962 ||  || — || February 24, 2006 || Kitt Peak || Spacewatch ||  || align=right | 2.4 km || 
|-id=963 bgcolor=#fefefe
| 505963 ||  || — || May 3, 2008 || Mount Lemmon || Mount Lemmon Survey ||  || align=right data-sort-value="0.87" | 870 m || 
|-id=964 bgcolor=#d6d6d6
| 505964 ||  || — || January 31, 2008 || Catalina || CSS ||  || align=right | 3.6 km || 
|-id=965 bgcolor=#d6d6d6
| 505965 ||  || — || October 8, 2012 || Haleakala || Pan-STARRS ||  || align=right | 2.6 km || 
|-id=966 bgcolor=#E9E9E9
| 505966 ||  || — || March 26, 2011 || Mount Lemmon || Mount Lemmon Survey ||  || align=right data-sort-value="0.94" | 940 m || 
|-id=967 bgcolor=#d6d6d6
| 505967 ||  || — || December 9, 2012 || Haleakala || Pan-STARRS ||  || align=right | 2.5 km || 
|-id=968 bgcolor=#E9E9E9
| 505968 ||  || — || November 28, 2013 || Kitt Peak || Spacewatch ||  || align=right | 2.1 km || 
|-id=969 bgcolor=#d6d6d6
| 505969 ||  || — || March 28, 2015 || Haleakala || Pan-STARRS ||  || align=right | 2.6 km || 
|-id=970 bgcolor=#E9E9E9
| 505970 ||  || — || April 17, 1998 || Kitt Peak || Spacewatch ||  || align=right | 1.2 km || 
|-id=971 bgcolor=#E9E9E9
| 505971 ||  || — || September 24, 2008 || Mount Lemmon || Mount Lemmon Survey ||  || align=right | 2.2 km || 
|-id=972 bgcolor=#d6d6d6
| 505972 ||  || — || October 20, 2012 || Haleakala || Pan-STARRS || 615 || align=right | 1.5 km || 
|-id=973 bgcolor=#E9E9E9
| 505973 ||  || — || October 31, 2013 || Mount Lemmon || Mount Lemmon Survey ||  || align=right | 1.9 km || 
|-id=974 bgcolor=#E9E9E9
| 505974 ||  || — || November 27, 2009 || Mount Lemmon || Mount Lemmon Survey ||  || align=right | 2.6 km || 
|-id=975 bgcolor=#d6d6d6
| 505975 ||  || — || November 12, 2012 || Mount Lemmon || Mount Lemmon Survey ||  || align=right | 3.3 km || 
|-id=976 bgcolor=#E9E9E9
| 505976 ||  || — || March 26, 2010 || WISE || WISE ||  || align=right | 2.4 km || 
|-id=977 bgcolor=#FA8072
| 505977 ||  || — || February 10, 2004 || Socorro || LINEAR ||  || align=right | 1.2 km || 
|-id=978 bgcolor=#d6d6d6
| 505978 ||  || — || June 1, 2010 || WISE || WISE ||  || align=right | 3.6 km || 
|-id=979 bgcolor=#E9E9E9
| 505979 ||  || — || April 28, 2011 || Haleakala || Pan-STARRS ||  || align=right | 1.7 km || 
|-id=980 bgcolor=#d6d6d6
| 505980 ||  || — || November 12, 2012 || Haleakala || Pan-STARRS ||  || align=right | 3.1 km || 
|-id=981 bgcolor=#d6d6d6
| 505981 ||  || — || January 24, 2014 || Haleakala || Pan-STARRS ||  || align=right | 2.5 km || 
|-id=982 bgcolor=#d6d6d6
| 505982 ||  || — || February 8, 2010 || WISE || WISE ||  || align=right | 2.8 km || 
|-id=983 bgcolor=#E9E9E9
| 505983 ||  || — || September 20, 2008 || Kitt Peak || Spacewatch ||  || align=right | 2.1 km || 
|-id=984 bgcolor=#d6d6d6
| 505984 ||  || — || March 8, 2005 || Mount Lemmon || Mount Lemmon Survey ||  || align=right | 2.9 km || 
|-id=985 bgcolor=#E9E9E9
| 505985 ||  || — || September 3, 2008 || Kitt Peak || Spacewatch ||  || align=right | 1.8 km || 
|-id=986 bgcolor=#E9E9E9
| 505986 ||  || — || October 28, 2008 || Kitt Peak || Spacewatch ||  || align=right | 2.0 km || 
|-id=987 bgcolor=#d6d6d6
| 505987 ||  || — || October 6, 2012 || Haleakala || Pan-STARRS ||  || align=right | 3.4 km || 
|-id=988 bgcolor=#d6d6d6
| 505988 ||  || — || February 26, 2009 || Kitt Peak || Spacewatch ||  || align=right | 2.9 km || 
|-id=989 bgcolor=#E9E9E9
| 505989 ||  || — || October 16, 2012 || Mount Lemmon || Mount Lemmon Survey ||  || align=right | 2.7 km || 
|-id=990 bgcolor=#d6d6d6
| 505990 ||  || — || October 17, 2012 || Haleakala || Pan-STARRS ||  || align=right | 1.8 km || 
|-id=991 bgcolor=#d6d6d6
| 505991 ||  || — || March 17, 2004 || Kitt Peak || Spacewatch ||  || align=right | 2.1 km || 
|-id=992 bgcolor=#E9E9E9
| 505992 ||  || — || November 25, 2005 || Mount Lemmon || Mount Lemmon Survey ||  || align=right data-sort-value="0.81" | 810 m || 
|-id=993 bgcolor=#E9E9E9
| 505993 ||  || — || March 9, 2011 || Kitt Peak || Spacewatch ||  || align=right | 1.2 km || 
|-id=994 bgcolor=#d6d6d6
| 505994 ||  || — || January 18, 2009 || Kitt Peak || Spacewatch ||  || align=right | 2.9 km || 
|-id=995 bgcolor=#d6d6d6
| 505995 ||  || — || October 20, 2012 || Haleakala || Pan-STARRS ||  || align=right | 4.0 km || 
|-id=996 bgcolor=#d6d6d6
| 505996 ||  || — || February 13, 2009 || Kitt Peak || Spacewatch ||  || align=right | 2.5 km || 
|-id=997 bgcolor=#E9E9E9
| 505997 ||  || — || March 21, 2015 || Haleakala || Pan-STARRS ||  || align=right | 2.4 km || 
|-id=998 bgcolor=#d6d6d6
| 505998 ||  || — || March 21, 2015 || Haleakala || Pan-STARRS ||  || align=right | 2.6 km || 
|-id=999 bgcolor=#E9E9E9
| 505999 ||  || — || February 13, 2010 || Catalina || CSS ||  || align=right | 1.9 km || 
|-id=000 bgcolor=#d6d6d6
| 506000 ||  || — || May 12, 2004 || Anderson Mesa || LONEOS ||  || align=right | 4.5 km || 
|}

References

External links 
 Discovery Circumstances: Numbered Minor Planets (505001)–(510000) (IAU Minor Planet Center)

0505